= List of candidates in the 2009 Afghan presidential election =

Forty-four candidates were registered for the 2009 Afghan presidential election when the Independent Election Commission of Afghanistan (IEC) announced its official preliminary list of candidates on May 17, 2009. Three candidates withdrew from the race before the election took place, having thrown their support behind one of the top two contenders. Forty-one names appeared on the ballot paper, although a few more had by then announced through the media that they had dropped out.

== List of presidential candidates ==
The candidates participating in the Afghan presidential election on August 20, 2009, were:

Name	Preliminary voting results	notes
Abdul Hasib Arian	2027	A senior police official.; One of three candidates, beside the incumbent, Hamid Karzai, who ran for president in 2004.
Abdul Jabar Sabit	2560	Served as Afghan Attorney General in 2006.; Reported to be a former aide to renegade Gulbuddin Hekmatyar.
Abdul Latif Pedram	7311	One of three candidates, beside the incumbent, Hamid Karzai, who ran for president in 2004.; Leader of the National Congress Party of Afghanistan.; An ethnic Tajik.
Abdul Majid Samim	998	Withdrew from the election, and asked his supporters to vote for Hamid Karzai.
Alhaj Abdul Ghafor Zori	4955	Served as chief of finance for Nimroz Province from 1976 to 1978 and 2001–2003.
Alhaj Shah Mahmood Popal		Withdrew his candidacy prior to the election.
Ashraf Ghani Ahmadzai	48375	Served as Afghan Finance Minister from 2002 to 2004.
Bashir Ahmad Bizhan	1272	Bizhan is a journalist.; Bizhan founded the Kangara Afghanistan National Party.
Baz Mohammad Kofi		Threw his support behind Hamid Karzai.
Bismillah Shir	2179	
Dr. Abdullah Abdullah	638924	Former Afghan Foreign Minister
Dr. Frozan Fana	8159	One of two female candidates in the 2009 election.
Dr. Ghulam Faroq Nijrabi	2240	One of three candidates, beside the incumbent, Hamid Karzai, who ran for president in 2004.; An ethnic Tajik, head of Afghanistan's Independent Party.
Dr. Habib Mangal	7339	Ambassador to the Soviet Union during the Soviet occupation of Afghanistan.; Medical doctor.
Dr. Mohammed Nasir Anis		Withdrew his candidacy prior to the election.
Engineer Moin-ul-din Ulfati	1645	
Gul Ahmmad Yama	1434	Prior to his candidacy Yama had been a scholar in literature.
Haji Hasan Ali Sultani		Withdrew his candidacy prior to the election.
Hajji Rahim Jan Shinzad	3118	
Hamed Karzai	940558	President of the Afghan Interim Administration and the Afghan Transitional Administration, and then elected the first post-Taliban President in 2004.
Hidayat Amin Arsala	1067	Afghan Foreign Minister in the coalition government that preceded the Taliban.; Also served as Afghan Commerce Minister.; Has a PhD in economics from George Washington University.
Mahbob-U-lah Koshani	5755	An economist, with a Master's from Moscow University.; A co-founder of the Afghanistan Liberal Party.
Mawlana Abdul Qadir İmami Ghori		Withdrew his candidacy in early August, 2009.; He urged his supporters to vote for Sayed Jalal Karim.
Mawlawi Mohammad Sayed Hashimi		Threw his support to Hamid Karzai in late July.
Mirwais Yasini	23059	Currently speaker of the Wolesi Jirga, the lower house of Afghan's national legislature.
Mohammad Akbar Oria	1353	
Mohammad Hakim Torsan		Withdrew his candidacy prior to the election.
Mohammad Hashim Tawfiqi	2406	An economist who has served as Deputy Minister of the Afghan Ministry of Mine and Industry
Mohammad Sarwar Ahmadzai	4028	
Mohammad Yasin Safi		Withdrew his candidacy prior to the election.
Motasim Billah Mazhabi	18248	
Mullah Abdul Salam Rakity	8250	Famous for shooting down a Soviet helicopter with rocket propelled grenade during the Soviet occupation.; Taliban field commander.; Elected to the National assembly.
Mullah Ghulam Mohammad Rigi	2240	
Nasrullah Baryalai Arsalai		Threw his support behind Dr Abdullah in mid-July.
Ramazan Bashardost	277404	Formerly Afghan Planning Minister.; Law degree from Toulouse University.
Sangin Mohammad Rahmani	1138	
Sayed Jalal Karim	5572	
Shahla Ata	4356	One of two female candidates in the 2009 election.
Shahnawaz Tanai	13512	Formerly chief of Afghanistan's army under the Soviet-backed Republic of Afghanistan.
Zabih-U-llah Ghazi Noristani	1516	
Zia-ul-haq Hafizi	724	

== See also ==
- Afghan Transitional Administration
- Civilian casualties of the War in Afghanistan (2001–present)
- Demography of Afghanistan
- International public opinion on the war in Afghanistan
- List of Afghan Transitional Administration personnel
- War in Afghanistan (1978–present)
- War in Afghanistan (2001–present)
- Northern Alliance
