= Habib Mangal =

Afghan citizen (born 1946)

- Born: 1946 (age 79–80); Qalandar District, Khowst Province
- Occupation: economist

Habib Mangal is an Afghan citizen who was a candidate in Afghanistan's 2009 Presidential elections. He is a medical doctor who served as Afghanistan's ambassador to the Soviet Union from 1980 to 1986.

== Studies and medical career ==
Mangal is a medical doctor, who also has a doctorate in Social Sciences. According to a profile in the Pajhwok Afghan News, his secondary education was at the Rahman Baba Higher Secondary School, and his medical education was at Kabul Medical University. The profile doesn't state where or when he earned his doctorate in Social Science.

In 1977 and 1978 he worked as a doctor in Khost Hospital. He was subsequently the Public Health Director in Samangan Province.

== Political career ==
He joined the People's Democratic Party of Afghanistan (PDPA) in 1964, when he was 18 years old. According to his profile in the Pajhwok Afghan News, he worked as an activist for the party from 1964 to 1981. He helped found the Students' Movement at Kabul University in 1972 and 1973. He was imprisoned for his student union activities. He was imprisoned again in 1977-1978. The Pajhwok Afghan News profile attributed this second imprisonment to "political reasons", and to "intra-party differences". In 1979 he became a member of the PDPA's Central Committee.

From 1980 to 1986 Mangal held senior diplomatic posts. In 1986 he participated in a Constitutional Loya Jirga as a representative of Paktia. From 1987 to 1991 he represented Paktia in the Wolesi Jirga, the upper house of Afghanistan's National Legislature.

When the PDPA administration of Afghanistan fell in 1992 he traveled to the Netherlands, where he remained until 2009. According to his Pajhwok Afghan News profile, he was active in the Afghan expatriate community in the Netherlands.

== Diplomatic career ==
According to his Pajhwok Afghan News profile, he was Afghanistan's ambassador to the Soviet Union and non-resident ambassador to Finland, Romania and Cyprus, from 1980 to 1986.

== Presidential candidacy, 2009 ==
During the 2009 Presidential elections he placed 10th in a field of 38. He gained 7,339 votes.
