= Shahla Ata =

Afghan politician (1959–2015)

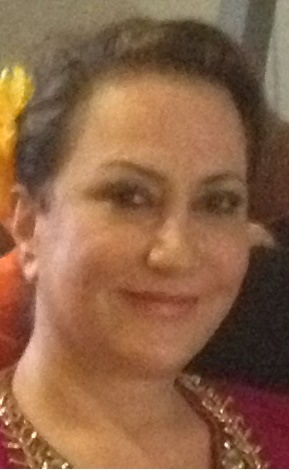
- Born: October 20, 1959; Kabul, Afghanistan
- Died: March 12, 2015 (aged 55–56); Kabul, Afghanistan
- Occupation: Legislator
- Known for: Candidate for President of Afghanistan in 2009

Shahla Ata (October 20, 1959 – March 12, 2015) was an Afghan politician, congresswoman and one of two female candidates during Afghanistan's 2009 Presidential election. She told DiManno she and her family lived for 18 years in the United States. The Contender Biography published by Pajhwok Afghan News has her living in the United States from 1990 to 1994, and living in Pakistan for the remainder of the period 1986 to 2001, where she administered relief to other Afghan expatriates.

David Williams, writing in the Sydney Morning Herald, in 2005, when she first ran for Afghanistan's National Assembly, said her husband had been killed in factional fighting. Rosie DiManno, writing in the Toronto Star during her presidential campaign, wrote that Ata was the target of a smear campaign alleging the murder of her husband as well as one of her daughters. Ata pointed out to Dimanno that all five of her daughters were still alive. According to DiManno, Ata's husband died in the US in 1992 of natural causes. Dismissing the murder claims, Ata declared: "So, I'm alleged to have killed my husband and my daughter, then I ran back to Afghanistan to avoid American justice? This is what they write in the newspapers. I wish we had a functioning court system so I could sue." All five of Ata's daughters live currently in the United States.

== Family and career ==
A descendant of the Afghan Royal Family she's related to the former President of Afghanistan, Sardar Mohammad Daoud Khan, himself, a cousin of Mohammed Zahir Shah, Afghanistan's last Monarch. Ata is a widow and she has five daughters living in the United States.

Ata was a Registered Nurse and a trained psychologist, before becoming a Politician.

Elected to the upper house of the Afghan National Legislature Wolesi Jirga in 2005, she represented Kabul and served on the Jirga's commission for counter-narcotics and its monitoring commission.

Shahla Ata and Frozan Fana were the only two women candidates in the 2009 Afghan presidential election. Ballot results placed her in the fourteenth place in a field of thirty-two with 11412 votes.

During the presidential campaign she has said that if elected, she will continue the policies of President Mohammed Daoud Khan in the 1970s.

== Death ==
On March 12, 2015, Ata's lifeless body was discovered in her house and an investigation has been opened by Kabul Police Department's Criminal branch.
