= Sayed Jalal Karim =

Afghan politician

Said Jalal Karim
- Born: 1969 (age 56–57); Kabul
- Other name: Said Jalal Nabagha
- Occupation: Scholar

Said Jalal Karim is a citizen of Afghanistan who was a candidate in Afghanistan's 2009 Presidential elections.

== Academic career ==
Karim started attending Istiqlal High School in 1975 at age six, and graduated in 1977 at age eight. He received admission to Kabul University in 1978. He attended Columbia University in New York City instead. However, according to a profile by the Pajhwok Afghan News, President Hafizullah Amin ordered his return to Afghanistan.

Upon his return to Afghanistan, he and his father were then sent to Moscow University. In 1980, his remaining family members were able to make their way to Pakistan, which allowed Karim and his father to follow them. From Pakistan, he made his way to Saudi Arabia where he studied engineering, physics and Arabic at King Fahd University of Petroleum and Minerals. However, he left the university after three years at age 14. He graduated from the Faculty of Law and Political Science University of Beirut, Alexandria campus.

== Adult life ==
According to his Pajhwok Afghan News profile, Karim became a successful entrepreneur. According to the profile, in the early 1990s, he was called upon to serve as a mediator between warring groups in the civil war that followed the ouster of the communists.

The profile said he founded a radio station known as "The Voice of Afghanistan", which "advances the interests of independent, moderate Afghans from outside the country".

== Political background ==
Sayed Jalal has negotiated ceasefires and hostage releases between The Northern Alliance, The Taliban, and Iran. He operates within a network of influence that once included Benazir Bhutto.

== Presidential candidacy, 2009 ==
A week before the election, fellow candidate Mawlana Abdul Qadir İmami Ghori withdrew from the race and asked his supporters to vote for Karim instead. During the 2009 Presidential elections, he stood 13th in a field of 38. He polled 500,572 votes.
