= Gul Ahmmad Yama =

- Born: 1956 (age 69–70); Mazar-e-Sharif, Balkh province
- Occupation: Scholar

Gul Ahmmad Yama is a citizen of Afghanistan who was a candidate in Afghanistan's 2009 Presidential elections. Yama is from Mazari Sharif, in Balkh Province.

== Academic career ==
Yama conducted most of his primary and secondary education in Mazari Sharif, but he spent his final year, and graduated from Habibia High School in Kabul. He graduated from Kabul University in 1978 with a degree from the faculty of literature and social sciences.

In 1980 and 1995, he was a lecturer at Kabul University. In 1990, he was a visiting lecturer at the Sorbonne, in Paris, France.

He founded the Imam Ghazali cultural and social foundation in late 1991. According to the Pajhwok Afghan News, Yama described the foundation provided "training programs for mujahideen and youth in social, political and cultural issues."

From 2002 to 2004, he worked at the Kabul Education University. In 2005 he was a lecturer at the Leadership College in Kabul, an institution run by the United States Department of Defense.

Yama has served as a professional member of the translation board of Higher Education Ministry. According to the Pajhwok Afghan News, Yama described several periods of his life when he was pursuing private academic research.

== Political career ==
During the 2009 Presidential elections he stood 25th in a field of 38. He won 1,434 votes.
