= Motasim Billah Mazhabi =

Political candidate

- Born: 1964 (age 61–62); Pul-e-Khumri, Baghlan province
- Other names: Mutasimbillah; Ustad Mutasimbillah Mazhabi

Motasim Billah Mazhabi is a citizen of Afghanistan who was a candidate in the 2009 Afghan presidential election.

== Academic career ==
Mutasimbillah is from a family of religious scholars, and received religious instruction from his father Maulana Mohammad Ataullah Faizani and his uncle Maulana Gul Muhammad Kakar. He also attended a secular high school in Kabul. He earned a degree in economics from the Logistics and Military Economics Faculty of the Military University in Kabul.

== Public service ==
Mutasimbillah left Afghanistan for Pakistan in 1985. He also spent time in the United States. He founded the magazine Balagh in 1993. It is currently published in Pashto, Dari and English language editions, in Kabul.

According to a profile from the Pajhwok Afghan News, Mutasimbillah worked on behalf of Afghans and Afghan expatriates, helping to found a school and a clinic for refugees in Peshawar, Pakistan, and a clinic in Paktia Province. He helped found the Arianna Rehabilitation Association for Afghanistan in 1992 and the Shahid Ghulam Dastagir High School in Peshawar in 1993. He helped found the Islamic Council of the People of Afghanistan in 1996, and was its president until 1998.

== Presidential candidacy, 2009 ==
During the 2009 presidential elections he stood 13th in a field of 38. He won 7,841 votes.
