= Abdul Ghafor Zori =

Abdul Ghafoor Zori
- Born: 1950 (age 74–75); Zaranj, Nimroz province
- Known for: anti-Soviet militia fighter, politician

Al Hajj Abdul Ghafoor Zori is a citizen of Afghanistan who was a candidate in Afghanistan's 2009 Presidential elections.

Zori completed his high school education in 1971, at the Farokhi Sistani high school in Nimroz province. In 1971 and 1972 he worked in Herat, in its electrical administration. From 1976 to 1978 he worked in Nimroz for the Agriculture Development Bank.

During Afghanistan's Soviet occupation Zori fought against the Soviet backed Communist regime, from 1972 to 1992. Six of his brothers were killed during this war.

After the ouster of the communists he served as Nimroz province's chief of finance, from 1992 to 1994. He served as head of agricultural cooperatives from 1994 to 1995. During the Taliban regime, from 1995 to 2001, the Pajhwok Afghan News reports Zori said he continued to live in Nimroz where he "maintained political résistance against the Taliban".

He served as Nimroz province's chief of finance again, from 2001 to 2003.

During the 2009 Presidential elections he stood 14th in a field of 38. He won 4,955 votes.
