= Hasan Ali Sultani =

Afghan presidential candidate

- Born: 1941 (age 84–85)
- Known for: 2009 Presidential candidate

Haji Hasan Ali Sultani was a candidate in the 2009 Afghan Presidential elections.

According to a profile by Pajhwok Afghan News, after spending an estimated 200,000 Afghanis on his campaign, he resigned from the Presidential race on August 13, 2009, a week before the election. He said that he resigned because during the campaign, he had come to realize that Hamid Karzai was the best candidate, and he urged voters to re-elect him for a second term.

"My and my campaign team's goal is neither money nor power; we just want to work sincerely for the prosperity of the country and help Karzai win the vote."

They reported that he was a high school graduate, who had participated in a 1976 Loya Jirga.

His vice presidential running mates were Misri Khan Momand and Abdul Raqib.
