= Shah Mahmood Popal =

- Born: 1966 (age 59–60); Muhammad Agha district, Logar province
- Known for: anti-Soviet militia fighter, politician

Al Hajj Shah Mahmood Popal is a citizen of Afghanistan who was a candidate in Afghanistan's 2009 Presidential elections. Popal is a politician and a former commander during the Soviet occupation of Afghanistan.

He led the Afghanistan National Islamic Peace Party for six years.

Popal completed his high school education in 1985, in Peshawar, Pakistan, at the Omar Sani High School.

Popal fought as a jihadi commander under the National Islamic Front of Afghanistan during the Soviet occupation of Afghanistan.

He served briefly as the Governor of Logar Province, the Province where he was born, during the Afghan Interim Administration that followed the ouster of the Taliban, and preceded the elected administrations, that followed the adoption of a new constitution.

Popal stood for election during Afghanistan's 2009 Presidential elections but withdrew his candidacy prior to the elections.
