= Abdul Jabar Sabet =

Afghan politician (1945–2023)

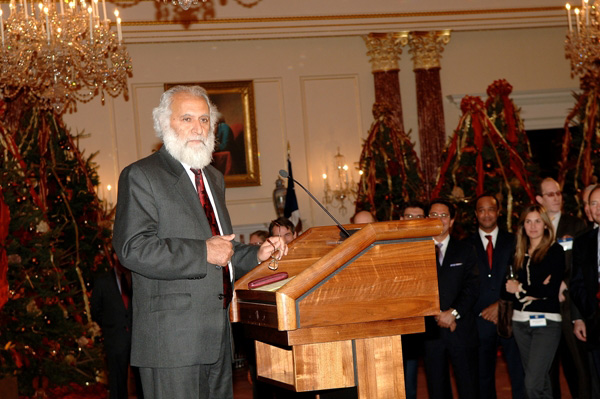
Abdul Jabar Sabit addresses American officials in Washington D.C, 2007

Abdul Jabar Sabet (Pashto: عبدالجبار ثابت; 1945 – 26 January 2023) was an Afghan politician. In May 2006 Hamid Karzai appointed him Attorney General of Afghanistan.

== Life and career ==
Sabet was an ethnic Pashtun Abdul Jabbar Sabit is originally from Kabul ,Char Asiab District Nownyaz village and also Surkh Rod District of Nangarhar Province kakrak village,he belongs to the Stanikzai Pashtun tribe,specifically the Ghafur Khel branch, and within Ghafur Khel, he is from the Sadat Khel branch. . He was a long time aide to former Afghan Prime Minister Gulbuddin Hekmatyar. After leaving Afghanistan, he worked in the U.S. for Voice of America.

After living in Montreal, Sabet returned to Afghanistan to work for a human rights organization, before being appointed special adviser at the Interior Ministry. He was promoted to Attorney General in May 2006. Sources close to President Hamid Karzai say that Sabet was promoted with U.S. support in exchange for giving positive comments about the Guantanamo Bay detention facility. He has however been critical of the Guantanamo release policy. A series of articles on former Guantanamo captives, published by the McClatchy News Service, quoted Sabet commenting that the release of Guantanamo captives seemed to be divorced from the captives' role in the Taliban, and to be focussed largely on whether the captives complied with the camp rules.

In April 2007, Sabet launched a violent raid on Tolo TV (the country's largest private TV chain) for what he thought was a "distorted" report on his comments regarding the country's judicial system. Seven journalists from the TV station were taken to his office by force without warrants and severely beaten.

== Accusation of corruption and breaking the law ==
On 17 April 2006, Sabet launched a raid on the country's most popular TV Channel Tolo TV. The raid ended with the detention and questioning of Tolo TV staff and journalists for broadcasting a news clip about Sabet. The raid was fiercely protested and announced as illegal by the lawmakers, the UN office UNAMA and independent journalists.

Following the raid, TOLO TV launched a formal complaint against Sabet and Co. "The complaint identifies at least 11 potential breaches of the law by Mr Sabet ... [and others], [for] the potential crimes ...of the utmost seriousness and directly affect issue of rule of law and sustainability of democracy in Afghanistan, especially given that they may be perpetrated by a person holding the highest operational legal position in Afghanistan."" Among others Tolo TV's complaint requested the "immediate suspension of Mr Sabet and his co-workers implicated in the incident, including the Commander of District 10 Police pending the finalisation of investigations. The results of this complaint remain unknown.

On 8 June 2007 Sabit reported that he was beaten in a revenge attack. Sabit said that General Din Mohammad Jurat was behind the attack, which he characterized as a failed kidnap attempt. The Voice of America reported:

His tough stand against corrupt officials and former warlords serving in President Hamid Karzai's government has earned him numerous enemies.

Despite Sabet's claims of being a champion of the anti-corruption fight, the Head of Afghanistan's Department of Corruption and Bribery, Izzatullah Wasifi, accused Sabet of corruption; he specifically said "...I am aware of many cases of [corruption] involving Attorney General [Sabet]." (Izzatullah Wasifi, 14, April 2008) It is worth noting, however, that Wasifi himself has been widely accused of corruption, by both Afghans and international observers, and spent several years in a U.S. prison after a conviction on drug charges.

On 8 May 2008, the Toronto Star devoted an article to Sabet's anti-corruption efforts. He told Toronto Star reporters that although he had arrested 300 Afghan officials on corruption charges in recent months he said he had been unable to keep even one of them behind bars.

== Presidential ambitions ==
On 17 July 2008, Hamid Karzai dismissed Sabet. His dismissal was reported to be triggered by Sabet's presidential ambitions.

In January 2009 an article by Ahmad Majidyar of the American Enterprise Institute included on a list of fifteen possible candidates in the 2009 Afghan Presidential election. He was one of 38 candidates in the election and preliminary results placed him 18th.
