= Mahbob-U-lah Koshani =

Afghan politician (born 1944)

- Born: 1944 (age 81–82); Badakhshan province
- Occupation: economicist

Mahbob-U-lah Koshani is a politician from Afghanistan who was a candidate in Afghanistan's 2009 Presidential elections.

== Academic career ==
Koshani graduated from Habibia high school, and subsequently earned a master's degree from Moscow University, in economics.

== Political career ==
Koshani was a member of Afghanistan's Revolutionary Labor Union, served on its executive committee, and eventually became the head of the union.

The Revolutionary Labor Union merged with other political parties in 2007, to form the Afghanistan Liberal Party. Koshani became the deputy head of the new party.

During the 2009 Presidential elections he stood 13th in a field of 38. He won 5,572 votes.
