= Ghulam Faroq Nijrabi =

Afghan politician (born 1954)

- Born: 1954 (age 71–72)
- Occupations: physician, lecturer
- Known for: Candidate for President of Afghanistan in 2009

Ghulam Faroq Nijrabi was a candidate in the Afghan presidential election in 2004 and in 2009. Nijrabi is a physician and a lecturer at Kabul University's medical college.

In 2009 Nijrabi ranked 20th in a field of 38, with 2,240 votes.
