= Zabih-U-llah Ghazi Noristani =

- Born: 1952 (age 73–74); Ghaziabad village, Ghaziabad district, Nuristan province

Zabih-U-llah Ghazi Noristani is a citizen of Afghanistan who was a candidate in Afghanistan's 2009 Presidential elections.

== Academic career ==
He completed his secondary education was at the Rahman Baba High School of Kabul in 1970. He earned a bachelor's degree at the Agriculture Higher Studies Institute in 1975.

== Military and political service ==
He worked on a joint project of Kunar forestry department and the United Nations Food and Agriculture Organization from 1975 to 1978.

He was both an active fighter during the Soviet occupation, and he participated in the political opposition to Soviets. In 1978 he founded the Islamic Freedom Front of Afghanistan Party, a local party in Nuristan Province.

In 1990, after the Soviets left Afghanistan, he moved to the USA, where he lived until 2006. In America he was active in the Afghan expatriate community.

In 2006 the Islamic Freedom Front changed its name to the Justice and Development Party of Afghanistan.

== Presidential candidacy, 2009 ==
During the 2009 Presidential elections he stood 25th in a field of 38. He received 1,516 votes.
