= Mohammad Sarwar Ahmedzai =

Afghan politician

Sarwar Ahmedzai
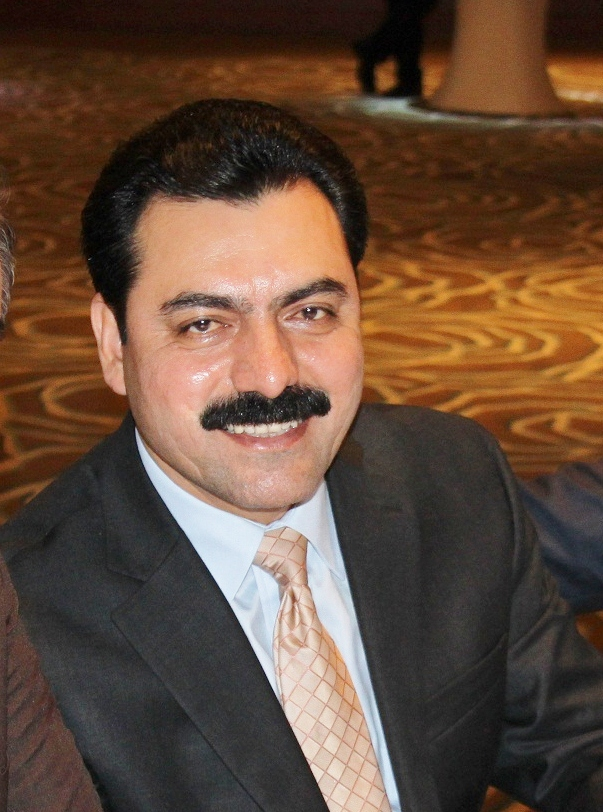
- 2014 candidate
- Born: 1972 (age 53–54); Logar province
- Other name: Sarwar Ahmedzai
- Known for: Afghan presidential candidate
- Website: www.sarwarahmedzai2014.com

Sarwar Ahmedzai is a citizen of Afghanistan who was a presidential candidate in 2009 and 2014. He served as Deputy National Security Advisor to President Ashraf Ghani until the overthrow of his government by Taliban.

== Academic career ==
Sarwar Ahmedzai was born in the Logar Province of Afghanistan. At the age of 7, his family moved to Pakistan due to the Soviet-Afghan war. He completed his education in Pakistan.

At the age of 16, Ahmedzai was the first Afghan refugee to be sent to the U.S. as a foreign exchange student, and graduated from a high school in Virginia.

He earned a bachelor's degree in political science at Edwards College, Peshawar and a master's degree in international relations from the University of Peshawar. He received a law degree from the University of Peshawar's Law College.

During his time at Peshawar University, Ahmedzai was elected central chairman of the Afghan Students Union (ASU) in 1990, and served until 1996. According to a profile prepared by the Pajhwok Afghan News, under his leadership, the organization aided thousands of Afghan students with books.

Ahmedzai led two delegations to Afghanistan, in 1993 and 1994, to try to mediate between the warring factions Burhanuddin Rabbani and Gulbadin Hekmatyar, in the civil war that followed the overthrow of the communist regime in 1992. Rabbani and Hekmatyar were then the nominal president and nominal prime minister of a fractured Afghanistan.

== Political career ==
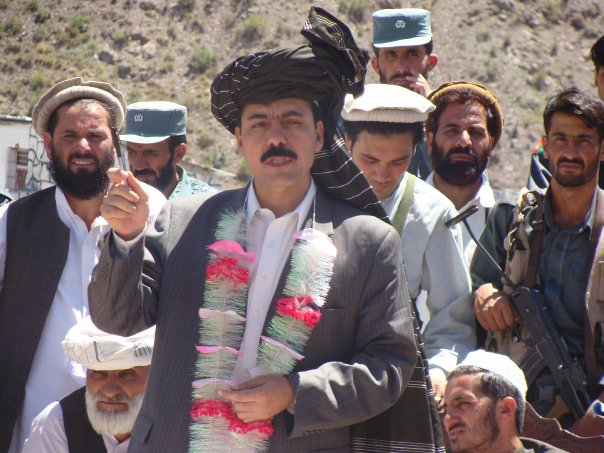
Ahmedzai in rally talks

Ahmedzai served on the first Loya Jirga to follow the overthrow of the Taliban in 2002. According to the Pajhwok Afghan News profile, he served as a coalition builder in the Loya Jirga.

According to the Pajhwok Afghan News profile, he drafted an important "Afghanistan Country Report – 2009".

During the 2009 presidential elections he stood 6th in a field of 38.
