= Ghulam Mohammad Rigi =

Ghulam Muhammad Rigi
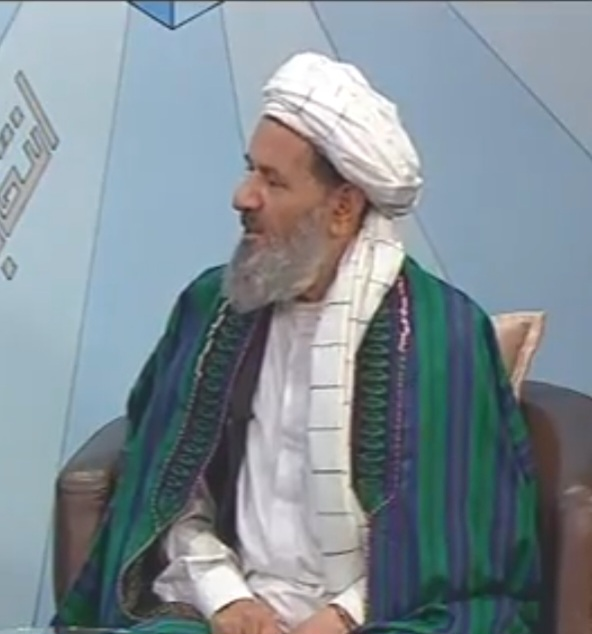
- Born: 1947 (age 78–79); Anar Dara district, Farah province

Ghulam Muhammad Rigi was a candidate in Afghanistan's 2009 Presidential elections. In an interview with Ferozan Rahmani of the Pajhwok Afghan News he stated that all the planks in his platform were based on Islamic law.

He stated that he felt the Taliban and Hezbi Islami militants should be offered an amnesty. He stated that Afghanistan didn't need foreign military forces and vowed to punish those who swindled foreign aid. He stated that Afghan women should be accorded all the rights encoded in Islam.
