= Mohammad Hashem Taufiqui =

Mohammad Hashim Tawfiqi
- Born: June 6, 1942; Kabul Afghanistan
- Died: June 6, 2021; Kabul Afghanistan
- Occupation: Economist
- Known for: Presidential candidate

Mohammad Hashem Taufiqui (Persian: الحاج محمد هاشم توفیقی) (June 6, 1942 – June 6, 2021, Kabul) was one of the candidates in the presidential election of 2009 in Afghanistan. Taufiqui was an economist working in different posts in the previous states of Afghanistan. He was an admirer of Daoud Khan, the first president of the republic of Afghanistan. His goal was to use Khan's industrial models to develop the industry in Afghanistan. Taufiqui has also had an important role in the drawing of these models during the presidency of Mohammed Daud Khan. Under Taufiqui's leadership, agricultural production in Afghanistan increased from 20,000 tons to 160,000 tons.

== Biography ==
Mohammad Hashem Taufiqui was the son of Mohammad Akbar Khan, son of Mohammad Ali Khan, son of Sardar Sultan Mohammad Khane Telayee and the son of Sardar Payenda Khan.

After graduating from Lese Habibya he joined the Faculty of Science in Kabul for one year. He then continued to his studies abroad in Germany and the United Kingdom for 11 years. There he learned mechanical engineering, industrial chemistry, management and political economy.

Taufiq was a candidate in the 2009 Afghan presidential elections. Preliminary results placed him 19th in a field of 38.

== Administrative and ministerial works ==
- General Head of Nasaji Dawlati, Nasaji Bagrami, Nasaji Balkh
- General Head of Sanaye (Industry)
- Assistant of Ministry of Mine and Industry

== Achievements ==
- Activating the great loom factory of Gulbahaar
- Launching the loom of Bagrami
- Launching the Carpentery of Kunarhaa
- Reactivating the woolweaving of Polecharkhi
- Reactivating the Chinisaazi Shaaker
- Reactivating they bicycle production company
- Reactivating the glass production company
- Launching the loom and cement of Herat
- Launching the loom and woolweaving of Kandahaar

== Activities during Taliban ==
- Launching and reactivating of different looms in Kandahaar, Balkh and Pole khomri.

== Writings ==
- Economic development of Afghanistan (Dari: enkeshafe eqtesaadi Afghanistan)
- A brief look at the industrial development of Afghanistan (Dari: yak negahe mokhtasar ba enkeshafe sanati Afghanistan)

== Goals ==
- Providing individual and national liberty and freedom for all the people of Afghanistan
- Providing 24/7 electricity
- Providing drinkwater for all the people of Afghanistan
- Providing water for agricultural regions
- Providing work and residence for all Afghans
- Focusing on using the plans of Mohammed Daoud Khan.
