= Abdul Qadir Imami Ghori =

Afgani politician (born 1954)

- Born: 1954 (age 71–72); Ghor Province

Mawlana Abdul Qadir Imami Ghori is a citizen of Afghanistan, and a candidate in the 2009 Afghan Presidential elections. He was one of the participants at the Bonn Conference in late 2001 that agreed that Hamid Karzai should be the leader of the Afghan Transitional Administration. He was elected to represent Ghor Province, where he was born, in the Wolesi Jirga, the upper house of Afghanistan's national legislature, during the elections in 2005.

== Academic career ==
Ghori has studied at both secular and religious institutions. He has a Master's degree in Islamic Economics and Islamic Studies from Peshawar University, in Pakistan.

He is the author of several books.

In early August 2009, shortly before the election, he withdrew his candidacy, and requested his supporters vote for Sayed Jalal Karim.
