= Bashir Ahmad Bezan =

Afghan politician

- Born: 1966 (age 59–60); Kabul

Bashir Ahmad Bezan is a citizen of Afghanistan who was a candidate in Afghanistan's 2009 Presidential elections.

== Academic career ==
Bezan graduated from the Khwaja Abbdullah Ansari higher secondary school in 1992. He subsequently enrolled in Kabul University's Journalism Department.

== Journalistic career ==
Bezan was the founder and editor of the Cinna magazine, a weekly cultural magazine. He served as the editor of Parwaz, the in-flight magazine of Ariana Airlines. Immediately prior to the elections, he was the editor of Khabar Nigar.

== Political career ==
Bezan founded the Kangara Afghanistan National Party. He ranked 28th in a field of 38, with 1,272 votes.
