= Wahid Omar =

Afghan politician

Waheed Omar

Ambassador of Afghanistan to Italy Afghanistan's Permanent Representative to WFP, FAO and IFAD
- In office June 2016 – Incumbent
- President: Ashraf Ghani

Personal details
- Born: March 1978 (age 48) Kabul, Afghanistan
- Party: Independent
- Education: University of York

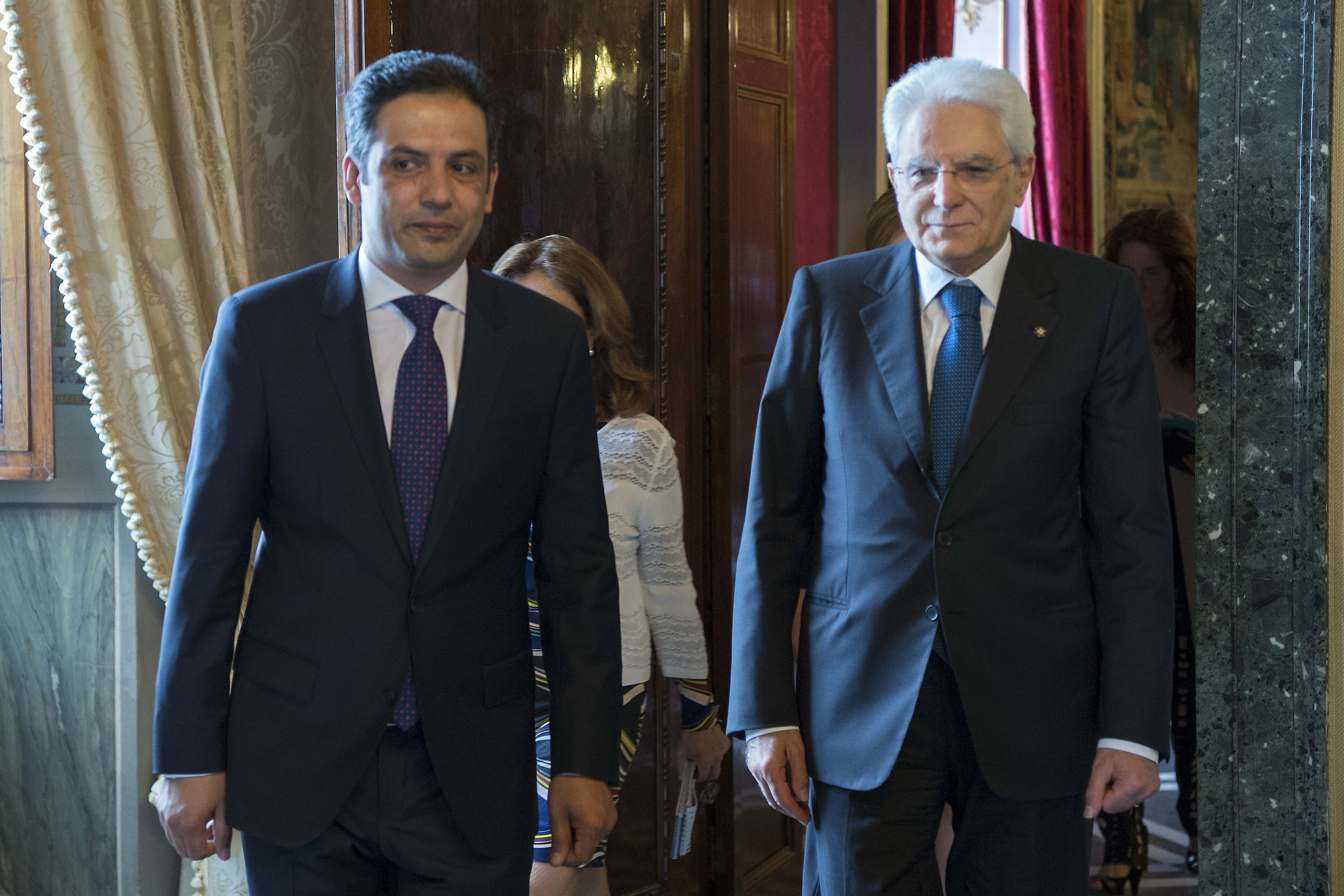
Ambassador Omer with Sergio Mattarella, President of Italy in Rome.

Waheed Omar (Dari:وحید عمر) (born March 1978) is a politician in Afghanistan currently serving as President Ghani's Senior Advisor and Director General of Office of Public and Strategic Affairs. From 2016 to 2019 he served as Ambassador of Afghanistan to Italy. He was also Afghanistan's Permanent Representative to World Food Programme, International Fund for Agricultural Development, FAO and IDLO. Between 2009 and 2011 he served as Chief Spokesperson of President of Afghanistan, Hamid Karzai. He helped President Karzai win his second term as Communications Director of his reelection campaign in 2009. During the electoral campaign and the aftermath of the election he was often seen as Karzai's one-man frontline. Both President Karzai's supporters as well as his opponents recognized Waheed Omer's eloquence, civil debate skills, his equal fluency in Pashto and Persian, and his media-management skills.

Before being a campaign spokesperson, Omar was the founding Director of the Government Media and Information Center, formed in 2009 to oversee communications between the government, Afghan citizens and the international community.

== Biography ==
Waheed Omar was born and raised in Kabul. His early schooling took place in Kabul and Peshawar, Pakistan. He later attended the University of York in the United Kingdom where he received a Master of Arts degree in political science. At York, Omar focused on Post-Conflict Reconstruction and Development. His MA thesis was on South Africa's post-apartheid transitional justice mechanisms and how on how some of those lessons could be applied to post-war Afghanistan.

Before his appointment as Karzai's chief spokesperson, Omar served the Government of Afghanistan in several high-level positions, including as the deputy director of the Office of Administrative Affairs (2007–2008), and the chief organizing officer of the Af-Pak Peace Jirga. He also has worked with international and domestic non-government institutions such as the Swedish Committee for Afghanistan, The Friedrich-Ebert-Stiftung and Sanayee Development Foundation. Omar has been an activist and writer from a young age, establishing Afghan Youth Foundation for Unity in Peshawer when he was in his early 20s. He led the establishment of FES, Afghanistan Young Leaders Forum in 2003. He has published a children's book and several articles and poems in Dari, Pashto and English.

Omar speaks both of the official languages of Afghanistan, Persian and Pashto, as well as English, and is proficient in Urdu/Hindi and German.

== See also ==
- Karzai administration
