= Abdul Majid Samim =

Former Afghanistan Presidential Candidate

- Known for: Afghan presidential candidate

Abdul Majid Samim is a citizen of Afghanistan who was a candidate in Afghanistan's 2009 presidential elections. He dropped out of the race on August 3, 2009, approximately two weeks before the election date. When he dropped out he said "Since the people consider Karzai a better candidate, I don't want to challenge him, because public aspirations are more important than my personal ambitions. If the people accept Karzai, so do I."

His three running mates were Obaidullah, Sayed Shah Agha and Nahuil Al-Hammed.
