= Roshanak Wardak =

Afghan doctor and politician

- Dari: روشنک وردگ; Pashto: روشنک وردگ
- Born: 1962 (age 63–64); Maidan Wardak Province, Afghanistan

Roshanak Wardak (Pashto: روشنک وردگ; Dari: روشنک وردگ; born 1962) is an Afghan gynaecologist and former politician from Maidan Wardak Province. In 2021, she was named as one of the BBC's 100 Women, alongside fifty other Afghan women.

== Medical career ==
During the Afghan Civil War in the early 1990s, during which her father was killed, Wardak was a refugee in Pakistan, where she offered medical support to fellow refugees. Wardak later returned to Afghanistan and started practicing gynaecology in 1996 after hearing that over 40 women had died in childbirth in her native Maidan Wardak Province. She opened her first clinic that year, shortly before the start of the Taliban regime. During this period, Wardak was the only female doctor practicing in Maidan Wardak Province; she further challenged norms by refusing to wear the burqa, while still adhering to Islamic dress codes. Wardak resumed her full-time work as a doctor after her political career ended in 2010.

== Political career ==
Wardak's father and grandfather had both been local politicians, and in the 2005 parliamentary election Wardak stood as an independent candidate, and was elected as a member of the House of the People for Maidan Wardak Province. During her time as an MP, Wardak was critical of Western military intervention in Afghanistan, and supported forming relationships with the Taliban to come to more lasting agreements and to prevent further conflict. She also praised elements of the Taliban government in place during the late 1990s, including the level of security they brought to the country; she was more critical of the subsequent Taliban insurgency, which she likened to a group of criminals. Wardak has also criticised the Taliban for its stance on female education, commenting in 2010 that Maidan Wardak Province had no girls' schools in its Pashtun districts where support for the Taliban was highest. Wardak continued working part-time as a doctor at a hospital in Saydabad during her tenure as an MP. Following the 2010 parliamentary election, Wardak stopped being an MP; during the election campaign she had received threats from Taliban officials, and accused other candidates of ballot stuffing.

Wardak initially praised the Taliban's return to power following the fall of Kabul in August 2021, considering the previous government led by Ashraf Ghani to have been corrupt. She has since become more critical of the regime, particularly with regards to its position on girls education, and has advocated publicly for the reopening of girls' schools throughout the country.

== Personal life ==
Wardak was born and raised in Maidan Wardak Province, Afghanistan. As of 2021, Wardak is unmarried and lives in Saydabad, where she operates a private clinic.

== Recognition ==
She was recognized as one of the BBC's 100 women of 2021.
