= 2009 Afghan presidential election =

- 20 August 2009
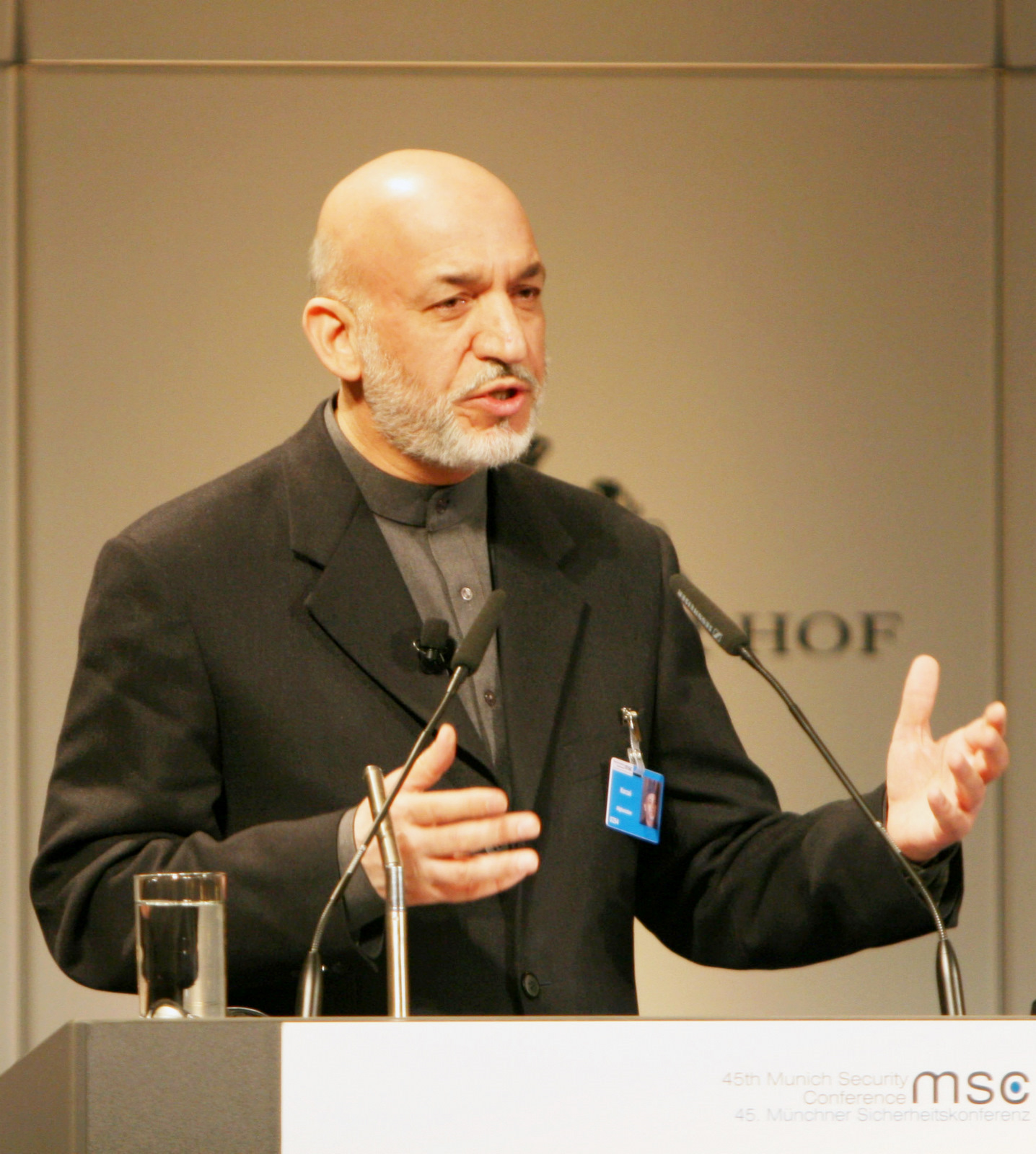

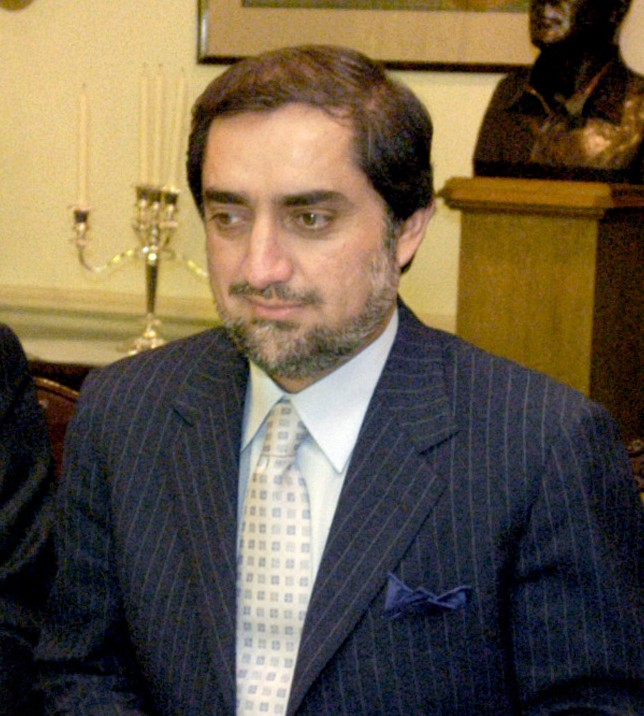
| Nominee | Hamid Karzai | Abdullah Abdullah |
| Party | Independent | United National Front |
| Popular vote | 2,283,907 | 1,406,242 |
| Percentage | 49.67% | 30.59% |
- Results by province
President before election
Hamid Karzai
Independent
Elected President
Hamid Karzai
Independent

Presidential elections were held in Afghanistan on 20 August 2009. The election resulted in victory for incumbent president Hamid Karzai, who received 49.7% of the vote, while his main rival Abdullah Abdullah finished second with 30.6% of the vote.

The elections were characterized by lack of security, low voter turnout, low awareness of the people about the electoral process, widespread ballot stuffing, intimidation, and other electoral fraud. A second round run-off vote, announced under heavy U.S. and ally pressure, was originally scheduled for 7 November 2009, but cancelled after Abdullah refused to participate, and Hamid Karzai was declared president for another five-year term.

The elections were the second under the 2004 constitution and were held on the same day as elections for 34 provincial council seats. The Taliban called for a boycott of the election, describing it as a "program of the crusaders" and "this American process".

== Election date ==
Under the 2004 constitution, elections should have been held no later than 60 days before the end of President Karzai's term in July 2009. The Independent Election Commission (IEC) originally recommended that the poll be held at the same time as the 2010 parliamentary balloting to save costs. However, politicians in the country were unable to agree to the details. Concerns about accessibility to mountainous areas in spring 2009 and the ability of getting adequate people and materials in place by then led the IEC to announce the elections would be delayed to August 2009.

The opposition accused Karzai of attempting to extend his power past his term. In February 2009, President Hamid Karzai called on the Independent Election Committee to hold the election according to the country's constitution, thereby forcing the IEC to reiterate the August date, and silencing critics, who feared a leadership vacuum between May and August. Some potential Afghan opponents complained Karzai's move was an attempt to clear the field of challengers, most of whom would not be ready to campaign for the 2009 election. After the IEC and the international community rejected Karzai's decree, Karzai accepted the date of August 20, 2009. The Supreme Court of Afghanistan announced in March 2009 that Karzai's term would be extended until a new leader had been elected. His opponents called the decision unconstitutional and unacceptable, pointing out that it put Karzai in a position to exploit the office to secure his electoral victory.

The election date of August 20, 2009 was one day after the Afghan anniversary of the formal end of Britain's third attempt to conquer Afghanistan ninety years ago in 1919.

== Candidates ==
Forty-four candidates had registered for the presidential election when the Independent Election Commission of Afghanistan (IEC) announced its official preliminary list of registered candidates on May 17, 2009. Three candidates withdrew from the race before the election took place, having thrown their support behind one of the top two contenders. Each presidential candidate ran with two vice-presidential candidates.

Karzai filed his candidacy on May 4, 2009; he retained incumbent second Vice President Karim Khalili, who is from the Hazara ethnic group but exchanged the first Vice President Ahmad Zia Massood for Mohammad Qasim Fahim, a Tajik former warlord blamed by human rights groups for mass civilian deaths during the Afghan Civil War.

The United National Front announced on April 16, 2009, that they would nominate former foreign minister Dr. Abdullah Abdullah as their presidential candidate. Abdullah was foreign minister of the Northern Alliance from 1998 onwards, and was a dominant figure in the Alliance. He was appointed foreign minister in the interim government that was installed after the U.S. invasion.

The first person to have declared his intention to run, Dr. Ramazan Bashardost formally registered for the presidential election on May 7, 2009, with vice-presidential candidates Mr. Mohammad Mosa Barekzai, a professor at the Kabul Agricultural Institute and Ms. Afifa Maroof, a member of the Afghanistan Independent Human Rights Commission, and with a dove, a symbol of peace and liberty, as their campaign symbol. Bashardost openly criticized the government and accused ministers of corruption. While serving as the planning minister, he was critical of foreign organizations in Afghanistan eating up aid money meant for the Afghan people and later resigned under government and foreign pressure.

Dr. Ashraf Ghani, a senior fellow in foreign policy at the Brookings Institution in Washington D.C., and former finance minister, UN special advisor, and World Bank analyst, registered as a presidential candidate on May 7, 2009. At a time when many Afghans would have preferred to lessen the appearance of ties to the U.S. government, he had the distinction of hiring Clinton-campaign chief strategist James Carville as his campaign advisor. His close ties to Washington placed him among those that Afghans considered to be "Zana-e-Bush", literally "Bush's wives". Ashraf Ghani was also reported as the candidate most favoured by the U.S. for appointment to a "chief executive officer" position that the U.S. intended to insert regardless of the winner of the election.

Mirwais Yasini, the First Deputy Speaker of the Afghan House of the People joined the race in March 2009. He was previously a member of the Emergency Loya Jirga convened in 2002, served as deputy of the Loya Jirga, and director of counter narcotics and deputy minister of counter narcotics.

Shahla Atta, a liberal female MP and war widow also stood, pledging to revive the modernizing policies of 1973–1978 president Mohammad Daoud Khan.

Other presidential contenders included the leader of the Justice and Development Party of Afghanistan Zabihullah Ghazi Nuristani; former attorney general Abdul Jabbar Sabit; former defence minister Shah Nawaz Tanai; Uzbek leader Akbar Bai; economy expert and current senior minister Hedayat Arsala; economist Mohammad Hashem Taufiqui; Sarwar Ahmedzai, a former member of the 2002 Afghan Loya Jirga who authored a 2009 country report for U.S. officials formulating a new U.S. strategy for Afghanistan; and others.

Along with the presidential candidates, were 3197 candidates for 420 provincial council positions. A Provincial Council in each of Afghanistan's 34 provinces advises and works with the provincial administration, headed by a Governor that is appointed by the President.

=== Prominent involvement of warlords ===
According to human rights groups, at least 70 candidates with links to "illegal armed groups" were on the ballot list in the election.

While the electoral law disallowed candidates with links to "illegal armed groups", and the Karzai-appointed Independent Election Commission had barred 56 other candidates that it identified as being commanders or members of illegal militias, many of the bigger warlords, including current parliamentarians and provincial council members elected in 2004 and 2005, simply bypassed this by registering their militias as private security companies or by having the right political connections.

Both of Hamid Karzai's vice-presidential candidates and many of his key allies in the election are alleged to have committed widespread human rights violations and war crimes. Human Rights Watch has called for Vice President Karim Khalili and key ally, former army chief of staff General Abdul Rashid Dostum, to face trial before a special court for alleged war crimes. Khalili is alleged to have been responsible in the killing of thousands of innocent people.

Karzai's other vice-presidential candidate and former senior security advisor Mohammad Qasim Fahim, along with Karzai backer and former energy minister Ismail Khan, have also been listed by the human rights group as among the "worst perpetrators." Better known as Marshal Fahim, the vice-presidential candidate is accused of having been a former Communist secret police chief, murdering prisoners of war during the 1990s, running private armed militias, and involvement in kidnapping and other crimes after 2001. Fahim, a key U.S. ally in the U.S. invasion of Afghanistan, had also previously served as Karzai's First Vice President and Minister of Defense, having been appointed to those positions in the interim and transitional governments installed after the 2001 invasion. Karzai is also being advised by Abdul Rasul Sayyaf, who is said to have first invited Osama bin Laden to Afghanistan and has lobbied for an amnesty for warlords.

Most prominently covered was the dramatic return, three days before the election, of General Abdul Rashid Dostum from exile in Turkey as part of a deal to help bring President Karzai to victory. After allegedly kidnapping and beating up a political rival, he was removed as Karzai's army chief of staff in late 2008 and disappeared into exile in Turkey. A key U.S. ally during the U.S. invasion of Afghanistan, General Dostum is arguably the most notorious of Afghanistan's warlords, accused of massive human rights abuses, including the Dasht-i-Leili massacre of up to 2,000 Taliban who were suffocated in cargo containers in late 2001. He is also alleged to have crushed one of his own soldiers to death by tying him to the tracks of a tank.

Many Afghans hate these powerbrokers in the Afghan government, angered that they evaded accountability for their human rights abuses in the nineties and regained power and land through private militias funded by the millions of dollars they were paid by the CIA in the 2001 U.S. invasion.

Analysts have suggested that part of Karzai's strategy was to make deals with warlord allies to deliver large blocs of votes in return for key positions and influence in his new government or other significant promises.

In the immediate aftermath of the election, analysts and diplomats suggested that Karzai's alliances with strongmen like General Dostum had paid off, delivering him large numbers of votes in the north. Fahim delivered Tajik votes for Karzai, Khalili brought Hazara support, and Dostum delivered Uzbek votes.

=== Involvement of drug traffickers ===
Karzai's vice-presidential candidate, Marshal Muhammad Qasim Fahim, is also alleged to have long ties to drug trafficking, according to CIA reports from as early as 2002.

A crucial U.S. ally as the military commander of the Northern Alliance, he worked closely with the CIA in the 2001 U.S. invasion of Afghanistan and was rewarded with millions of dollars in cash. He was then appointed First Vice President and Minister of Defense in the interim and transitional governments installed after the invasion, handling more millions of dollars sent by the U.S. in military aid to raise and arm a new Afghan army. CIA intelligence reports in 2002 showed that Fahim had a history of narcotics trafficking before the U.S. invasion, and that he was still actively involved after being installed as defense minister, trafficking heroin via cargo plane flights north through Russia, with aides in the Afghan Defense Ministry also involved.

Hamid Karzai's election campaign manager for the south, and half-brother, Ahmed Wali Karzai – himself a candidate for re-election as the head of the Kandahar provincial council – has also long been alleged to have prominent drug trafficking ties, and was thought to control a significant proportion of Afghan heroin production. Numerous reports link him to the Afghan drug trade, according to officials from the White House, the State Department and the United States Embassy in Afghanistan. Officials at the Drug Enforcement Administration (DEA) and the Office of the Director of National Intelligence have alleged that the White House favored a hands-off approach with Ahmed Wali Karzai because of his political position. Only a week before the election he denied a report from German news magazine Stern that said that British special forces had found several tons of opium on his land. He claimed that this was being done just before the election to hurt Hamid Karzai's chance of re-election.

According to current and former U.S. officials, Ahmed Wali Karzai was also being paid by CIA, and had been for the past eight years. The New York Times reported on October 27, 2009, stating: "The C.I.A.’s practices also suggest that the United States is not doing everything in its power to stamp out the lucrative Afghan drug trade." Also alleged to have orchestrated much of the fraud in favour of his brother in the presidential election, Ahmed Wali Karzai was himself re-elected to the Kandahar provincial council in the August 20 vote.

== Campaign ==
The Afghanistan Independent Human Rights Commission (AIHRC), said insecurity had "severely limited freedom of movement and constrained freedom of expression for candidates". Security concerns prevented presidential candidates from campaigning in most of the provinces, and candidates running for provincial councils were under constant threat wherever they went. Widespread cultural opposition to women in public life, further compounded by the lack of security, made campaigning by women candidates very difficult or impossible in many parts of the country, according to EU observers.

A UN election monitoring report said in early August that there was mounting evidence that the government was using state resources to favour Karzai. An election commission report in July noted that state-run Radio Television Afghanistan had dedicated 71% of prime-time news coverage to the president.

Issues at the forefront in the election campaign were the insurgency and lack of security, the conduct of foreign troops in Afghanistan and civilian casualties, corruption, and poverty. Topics concerning women's rights were virtually never featured in news coverage of the electoral campaign, and women received almost no coverage in news reporting during the election, according to a European Union observation mission report.

Mr. Karzai announced that he would invite the Taliban to a Loya Jirga (a grand tribal council) to try to restart stalled peace talks. A May pre-election poll reported that over two-thirds, 68%, of Afghans thought their government should hold talks and reconcile with the Taliban, and 18% did not know or refused to answer. Only 14% did not support government talks and reconciliation with the Taliban. Karzai also said the country was growing in stature and would be able to prevent "foreigners" from jailing Afghans, referring to the foreign military forces operating in their country.

According to Ramazan Bashardost, the insurgency was motivated by the presence of foreign military forces in their country, by the presence of warlords and human rights abusers in the Western-backed regime, by the corruption in that government, and by poverty. Bashardost vowed that he would not allow foreign troops to stay in Afghanistan if elected.

Abdul Salam Rocketi, a former Mujahideen "freedom fighter" – whose name came from using rocket-propelled grenades to shoot down Soviet helicopters – and former Taliban commander, said he would announce an amnesty for all the insurgents if he won the election.

The Election Commission accredited 160,000 observers for the election. The Afghan Free and Fair Elections Foundation, the largest local monitoring group, said that it would have observers at 70 per cent of polling stations but couldn't observe the remainder because of security concerns.

=== Debates ===
Two candidate debates took place before the August 20 election. The first debate was held on July 23 and was broadcast on Tolo TV. It was supposed to feature Karzai, Abdullah, and Ghani, though Karzai later declined to take part, with his campaign blaming Tolo TV for being biased against him. A second debate took place on August 16 on RTA TV (the state broadcaster) and Radio Free Afghanistan involving Karzai, Ghani, and Bashardost, with Abdullah not participating.

=== Pre-election polls ===
The pre-election polls, funded by the U.S. government and conducted by Washington D.C.-based organizations, found Hamid Karzai leading his nearest rival, Abdullah Abdullah, by a wide margin, but suggested that he would not have the 50% support required to win the August 20 election outright, raising the prospect of a run off election in October.

Opinions on the following people (International Republican Institute, May 3–16, 2009)

| Person | Favorable | Unfavorable | Net difference |
|---|---|---|---|
| Hamid Karzai | 69% | 25% | 45% |
| Ramazan Bashardost | 31% | 33% | -1% |
| Abdullah Abdullah | 31% | 36% | -5% |
| Ashraf Ghani | 24% | 28% | -4% |

First round

| Poll Source | Date administered | Karzai | Abdullah | Bashardost | Ghani | Other candidate | undecided/DK/refused |
|---|---|---|---|---|---|---|---|
| International Republican Institute (likely voters)† | May 3–16 | 31% | 7% | 3% | 3% | 15% | 9% |
| Glevum Associates (registered voters) | July 8–17 | 36% | 20% | 7% | 3% | 13% | 20% |
| International Republican Institute (likely voters) | July 16–26 | 44% | 26% | 10% | 6% | 11% | 3% |

†(Note: May figures were from responses to an open-ended question before the list of presidential candidates was known)

Second round scenarios

Karzai – Abdullah

| Poll Source | Date administered | Karzai | Abdullah | Not voting | DK/refused |
|---|---|---|---|---|---|
| International Republican Institute | July 16–26 | 50% | 39% | 8% | 3% |

Karzai – Ghani

| Poll Source | Date administered | Karzai | Ghani | Not voting | DK/refused |
|---|---|---|---|---|---|
| International Republican Institute | July 16–26 | 60% | 22% | 14% | 4% |

††(The International Republican Institute survey did not ask respondents about a Karzai – Barshardost second round scenario)

The administering of public opinion polls for the 2009 presidential election was beset by numerous difficulties because of the lack of security, harsh geography, and lack of accurate demographic data, but analysts hoped that with improved sampling techniques the pre-election polls would be more predictive of the outcome than they were in 2004.

== Lack of security ==
Despite the surge of 30 thousand additional foreign military troops into Afghanistan in the three to four months leading up to the elections, and major military operations in the weeks and days ahead of the election, 12 out of Afghanistan's 34 provinces remained classified as "high risk" by the Afghan Ministry of Interior – meaning limited or no government presence – casting into doubt the ability of over one-third of the country to participate in the elections.

A week and a half before the election, the Afghan government announced that it had hired 10,000 tribesmen to provide additional security for the election in almost two-thirds of Afghanistan's provinces. The men were being paid $160 a month, would be non-uniformed, and would use their own guns to secure polling stations in 21 out of Afghanistan's 34 provinces.

ISAF officials stated two days before the election that the 60,000-troop ISAF military force in Afghanistan would halt all offensive operations on polling day in order to help Afghan forces maintain security for the presidential election. The order to halt operations and divert forces to help security followed a similar order issued to Afghan forces by Afghan President Hamid Karzai.

Because of the lack of security, the full list of polling centers was only announced on the actual polling day.

A day before the election, hundreds of polling stations were ordered closed in parts of the country where military and police forces fear to go and would not be able to provide protection for election monitors. It had previously been estimated that as many as 700 out of 7,000 polling stations across the country would not open because of the widespread insecurity. On election day, the Afghan election commission reported that only 6,200 polling stations had operated.

In Kandahar province, the mayor of Kandahar city, Ghulam Haider Hamidi, said that he would not go vote. "For the last three years the security is getting worse, day by day," Hamidi stated. "Even a child understands that the election day is not safe." His daughter, Rangina Hamidi, a prominent women's advocate, said that it was not worth the risk and that she would not vote either:

"My message to the women of Kandahar is this: don't go vote and put yourselves at risk for nothing."

=== Attacks ahead of the vote ===
Already in the month preceding the election day, there was a rise in violent incidents, all over Afghanistan, including a suicide bomber attack on the Indian embassy in Kabul on July 7. An ISAF spokesperson stated two days before the election that insurgent attacks had averaged 32 per day in the last 10 days, but had spiked up to 48 attacks per day within the last four days. Among the major attacks reported:

- On August 15, 2009, five days before the election, a suicide car bomb struck NATO's headquarters at the core of Kabul's most fortified district, in the equivalent of Baghdad's Green Zone. The massive blast that shook the city left seven people dead and 91 wounded, including several foreign soldiers, four Afghan soldiers, and a member of parliament. The attack, inside several rings of security around the fortified embassies and government buildings by the presidential palace, was confirmed by a Taliban spokesperson to have had as targets the NATO military headquarters (HQ ISAF) and the U.S. embassy less than 150 meters away, and to have been part of a campaign to disrupt the elections.
- On August 18, 2009, two days before the vote, rocket attacks or mortar rounds struck near the presidential palace in Kabul, and a suicide car bomb attack on a NATO convoy heading to a British military base killed nine people and wounded around 50. One NATO soldier was killed and two others wounded. Two UN staff members were killed, and a third was wounded. About 12 vehicles were destroyed and several surrounding buildings were damaged by the blast. A suicide bomb attack at the gates of an Afghan army base in the province of Uruzgan also killed three Afghan soldiers and two civilians.
- On August 19, 2009, gunmen seized control of a bank in downtown Kabul one day before the Afghan election. The bold raid was the third major attack in Kabul in five days, shattering the capital city's relative calm since the last major attacks there in February. Police reported that three fighters and three policemen were killed in the four-hour-long siege.

=== Media blackout imposed ===
In decrees issued two days before the presidential election, the Afghan government imposed censorship for election day, barring news organizations from reporting any information about violence between 6 a.m. and 8 p.m. out of concern that reports of violence could reduce voter turnout and damage chances of staging a successful election. Low turnout could undermine the credibility of the election – and could also hurt Karzai's results in the election if not enough ethnic Pashtun people, who form his base of support, turned out for the vote in the insurgent-dominated south of Afghanistan.

On the eve of the election, police at the Kabul bank beat journalists and bystanders with rifle butts to keep them away from the scene where the bloody siege had taken place.

The head of the Afghan Independent Journalists' Association (AIJA) said that the government censorship decrees would not stop Afghan and foreign journalists from providing information to the public during the critical election period: "It shows the weakness of the government and we condemn such moves to deprive people from accessing news."

Human Rights Watch also criticized the news censorship, stating: "An attempt to censor the reporting of violence is an unreasonable violation of press freedoms."

The Free and Fair Election Foundation of Afghanistan called the Afghan government's limitation of media freedom on election day "a violation of democratic principles".

=== Election day violence ===
"This was one of the most violent days witnessed in Afghanistan in the last eight years."

— Rachel Reid, researcher for Human Rights Watch in Afghanistan

Afghan government officials reported that 73 incidents of violence had taken place in 15 provinces throughout the country during voting. That number of attacks represented a 50% spike over NATO figures for the violence in the days leading up to the poll.

The Afghan government also reported that at least 26 people were killed in the election day violence, including eight Afghan soldiers, nine police officers and nine civilians.

The government figures were impossible to verify, however, because of the government-imposed ban against reporting any information on violence. Anecdotal evidence suggested that the number of election day attacks could actually be much higher than the government reports.

Another report since has placed the number of attacks on election day in Afghanistan at more than 130.

ISAF has since reported that more than 400 militant attacks occurred on election day – making it one of the most violent days in Afghanistan since 2001. By comparison, ISAF had stated two days before the election that insurgent attacks had averaged 32 per day in the previous 10 days.

In one of the worst reported attacks, militants stormed the town of Baghlan in northern Afghanistan, forcing all polling stations there to be closed down, with fighting lasting for most of the day. The district police chief was among those killed.

Rocket attacks, gun battles, and bomb blasts occurred across much of the country, closing scores of polling stations. The province of Kandahar alone was hit by 122 insurgent rockets. Rockets and mortars were launched into Kandahar, the second largest city in the country, Lashkar Gah, the capital of Helmand province, Tirin Kot, the provincial capital of Uruzgan, as well as other cities.

In an unconfirmed report, militants hanged two people in Kandahar because their index fingers were marked with indelible ink, showing that they had participated in the election that militants consider a tool of foreign occupation. Before the elections militants had threatened to hack off the fingers seen stained by this ink, used to identify voters and prevent fraud. Nader Nadery, of the Free and Fair Election Foundation of Afghanistan (FEFA) said two voters had each lost their finger in southern Kandahar province.

In the capital city Kabul, militants took over a building before being killed after a two-hour shootout. The capital was also reported to have been hit by at least five bomb blasts.

Two British soldiers and one U.S. soldier were also killed in separate roadside bomb blasts in the southern and eastern parts of Afghanistan on election day.

Ichal Supriadi, an election observation supervisor with the Asian Network for Free Elections, reported that security fears had grounded many international observers, and that their election observation center had received many reports from their ground observers of people being discouraged from going out to vote.

==== The worst violence in 15 years ====
"Polling day recorded the highest number of attacks and other forms of intimidation for some 15 years. Regrettably, 31 civilians were killed, including 11 IEC officials as well as 18 Afghan National Police (ANP) and eight Afghan National Army (ANA) personnel."

— AIHRC-UNAMA report, October 21, 2009

In a report dated October 21, 2009, issued after the release of the final certified election results for the August 20 vote, the UN Assistance Mission in Afghanistan (UNAMA) and Afghanistan Independent Human Rights Commission (AIHRC) stated that on election day Afghanistan had suffered the highest number of attacks and intimidation the country had seen in some 15 years. The timeframe of 15 years, going back to around August 1994, coincides with Ahmed Rashid's description from "Taliban: Militant Islam, Oil and Fundamentalism in Central Asia" of when "Afghanistan was in state of virtual disintegration just before the Taliban emerged at the end of 1994. The country was divided into warlord fiefdoms and all the warlords had fought, switched sides and fought again in a bewildering array of alliances, betrayals and bloodshed."

=== Violence in the aftermath of the vote ===
"The highest level of civilian casualties since the fall of the Taleban in 2002 has been registered in Afghanistan in the period around the elections."

— Amnesty International, August 27, 2009

On August 25, 2009, a few hours after the first preliminary results were released, a cluster of vehicle bombs detonated together in a massive explosion that killed at least 43 people and wounded at least 65 in Kandahar city, in the bloodiest attack since July 2008. The force of the giant blast, at the center of the city in a district that includes U.N. facilities and an Afghan intelligence office, caused houses and buildings around to collapse, shattering windows around the city, and sending flames shooting into the sky. People miles outside of town felt the rumble. The main target appeared to be a Japanese company that had recently taken over a contract to build a road that insurgents had stalled for several months. A Taliban spokesman denied responsibility, saying the group condemned the attack.

On the same day, another bomb blast in southern Afghanistan killed four U.S. soldiers, bringing the total number of foreign troop deaths in Afghanistan this year to 295, making the 2009 death toll for foreign forces in Afghanistan the highest in the eight-year war since the 2001 U.S. invasion.

On August 26, 2009, the justice ministry director of Kunduz province, Sayed Jahangir, was killed by a bomb planted in his car in northern Afghanistan.

On August 27, 2009, Amnesty International issued a statement saying: "As uncertainty surrounds the outcome of presidential elections in Afghanistan, civilians are at greater danger than at any time since the fall of the Taleban."

August 2009 ended as the deadliest month for U.S. troops in Afghanistan since the U.S. invasion in 2001. At least 51 American soldiers were killed in the month of the election, the highest monthly toll for the U.S. in the nearly eight-year-long war, surpassing the previous high of 45 in July. The month was also the worst in the war in terms of the overall death toll for all foreign military troops, with 77 deaths. Along with 76 deaths in July, the two months were by far the deadliest for the foreign military troops in Afghanistan, according to figures from icasualties.org.

On September 12, 2009, a day on which the IEC was to have announced the first full preliminary results, waves of attacks engulfed Afghanistan. At least 66 people – including 24 civilians, 5 U.S. soldiers, and 26 Afghan policemen, soldiers, and guards – were killed in violence that swept across the country. The bloodshed seemed to demonstrate the ability of insurgents, including the Taliban, to carry out attacks in most parts of the country despite the surge to a record number of foreign military troops in the eight-year war.

=== Possible ethnic imbalance ===
The lack of security and its effects on voter registration, polling station accessibility, and voter turnout – mainly in regions populated by Afghanistan's Pashtun tribes, which make up 32-37% of the country's population – have raised serious concerns about an ethnic imbalance in the Afghan election.

"There are districts that I am 100 percent sure no government worker can go to - But you are telling me that still so many people registered? I don't believe it."

— Roshanak Wardak, Afghan member of parliament from Wardak Province

According to leaders and residents of Pashtun districts, many voter registration centers in their districts never opened during the registration period and few people even left their homes, let alone registered. Provincial officials have also said that election registration teams rarely, if ever, dared to venture outside of the district capitals.

In the province of Wardak, with six of the province's eight districts controlled by insurgents, this resulted in the two Hazara-dominated districts of the province forming the bulk of the new voters registered. Independent Election Commission (IEC) Deputy Chief Electoral Officer Zekra Barakzai stated that "the registration numbers in Pashtun districts are very low."

According to Habibullah Rafeh, a policy analyst with the Afghan Academy of Sciences, there could be an ethnic imbalance if the same problem was reproduced in other Pashtun regions of Afghanistan.

In Helmand province, where 62% of the population is Pashtun and where U.S. Marines conducted major offensives, only 75 people were found to have been registered in one town of 2,000 residents.

For those that did register to vote, the absence of polling stations because of lack of security may have been the next obstacle. In Helmand province, Haji Mohammad, from Marja district, said that he sold all his family's voting cards because there were no polling stations in their area.

On the day before the election, Afghan election officials ordered 443 polling stations within insurgent territory in the Pashtun-dominated provinces of Paktika, Paktia, Khost, Zabul, Helmand and Kandahar to stay closed because of the lack of security. While the Afghan election commission had until recently presented a figure of 7,000 polling stations, on election day it reported that only 6,200 polling stations had actually operated.

Compounded with its effects on voter registration and polling station accessibility, the lack of security also seems to have been a major factor in the much lower voter turnout in the Pashtun-dominated south of the country, where turnout was as low as 5–10%, effectively disenfranchising the region.

On election day, Abdul Hamid, a tribal elder from Paghman District – a mostly Pashtun district bordering Wardak province – was reported as insisting that 40 to 50% of eligible Paghman voters had not received voting cards, and therefore could not cast a ballot.

== Election fraud ==
Starting in December 2008, journalist Anand Gopal and others have reported extensively on the widespread instances of fraud in the voter registration process, with the registration rolls including "phantom voters" and multiple registration cards issued to a single registrant, amongst numerous other problems.

Two days before the election, an investigation by the BBC also found and reported evidence of widespread electoral fraud and corruption in the Afghan presidential election.

=== Voting cards being sold ===
After being informed that voting cards were being sold in the capital, Kabul, an Afghan working for the BBC posed as a potential buyer and was offered one thousand voting cards on the spot, for $10 (£6) per card. Samples provided were all authentic with the name, photo and home details of the voter on them. Other parties also offered to sell the BBC investigators thousands of votes, and some sellers have even been arrested by the authorities.

A flourishing black market in voter registration cards has also sprung up across the south of Afghanistan where they were being sold for £6 to £18 each. The Free and Fair Election Foundation of Afghanistan (FEFA), an independent election monitoring organisation, had also collected evidence of election fraud, particularly in the voter registration process. The monitoring group found that in many places people were being issued multiple voting cards, that voting cards were often issued for children, and that stacks of voting cards were given to men who falsely claimed that they were for women in their households. Long lists of imaginary female relatives were found to have been concocted during an attempt to update the electoral roll. In Kandahar, "Britney Jamilia Spears" appeared among the names registered. FEFA found that multiple registrations of a single person were taking place in at least 40% of all centers in one phase of the registration drive, and in one case, investigators found that about 500 voting registration cards were given to just one individual in Badghis province.

The independent election observers also reported that as many as one in five registrations were for people under the voting age – in many cases as young as 12 years old. According to a pre-election report by the Afghanistan Analyst Network, a Kabul-based group of foreign experts, as many as three million voters on the register were feared to not exist. The huge numbers of vote cards issued for phantom voters have raised concerns about massive electoral fraud. Shahrzad Akbar, a senior analyst with FEFA, stated that because the monitoring body was only able to investigate a few parts of the country, the election irregularities and abuses could be even more widespread:

"We couldn't observe how it went in every single district or village. I am sure that there are cases of multiple card distribution that we don't know about. But those incidents that we do know about caused us enough concern to contact the Independent Election Commission and say, 'please prevent this!'"

=== Bribes being offered ===
There has also been evidence that people working for candidates have deliberately tried to influence the outcome of the election by offering bribes to buy large numbers of votes.

In Baghlan province, a tribal elder and former military commander described how the voter fraud scheme worked. Within the hierarchical structure of Afghanistan, key local leaders like him have the ability to persuade large numbers of people to vote for one candidate or another. He reported that he and other local leaders had been approached by teams from the two leading contenders of the presidential election with monetary bribes:

"If one candidate gives $10,000, then the other gives $20,000 and a third one offers even more. It has become such a lucrative and competitive business. I don't know where they get their money from."

According to a U.S. government-funded poll released the week before the poll, the two leading contenders in the election were Hamid Karzai, the Pashtun incumbent, and Dr. Abdullah Abdullah, the former foreign minister with strong ties to the former Northern Alliance.

In Helmand province, tribal leaders and local people also described a systematic attempt by Karzai supporters to collect or buy voter registration cards from people in an electoral fraud scheme allegedly orchestrated by Karzai's half-brother and campaign manager for the south, Ahmed Wali Karzai.

=== Armed coercion ===
Along with bribes, cases of threats by warlords have also been reported. In Herat province, a village elder said he had been threatened with "very unpleasant consequences" by a local commander if the residents of his village failed to vote for Karzai.

Other instances of coercion in the electoral process – ranging from threatening phone calls to beatings and killings – by government agents (particularly security forces and armed factions aligned with certain candidates) have been extensively documented.

The hiring of 10,000 tribesmen by the Karzai government to secure polling stations in 21 out of 34 provinces, without uniforms and using their own guns, also raised questions of voter intimidation.

During the voting, intimidation of voters by some powerful candidates, in particular local candidates running for provincial council seats, was reported by observers.

In the northern province of Balkh, people were forced at gunpoint to vote for former foreign minister Dr. Abdullah Abdullah, according to complaints lodged with the election commission by former finance minister Dr. Ashraf Ghani in the days after the vote.

Meanwhile, both the Karzai and Abdullah camps have accused each other's side of having engaged in intimidation of voters, including allegations from Abdullah of intimidation and other interference by the head of the border police in Kandahar province, General Abdul Raziq, and his forces on behalf of Karzai.

=== Hundreds of polling stations shut down ===
The day before the election, Afghan election officials ordered more than 440 polling stations to stay closed during the vote out of fears of election fraud. The Independent Election Commission (IEC) said Hamid Karzai's supporters were trying to keep open polling stations deep within insurgent-held regions where the army and police fear going and where voting could not be properly monitored by observers.

An international observer monitoring the election proceedings said that the IEC had come under "a lot of pressure" from the Karzai administration to open more polling stations in the provinces of Paktika, Paktia, Khost, Zabul, Helmand and Kandahar where the government has little control beyond major urban centers.

Registration figures suggested that concerted preparations for vote-rigging had taken place in Khost and Paktia. Records suspiciously showed that twice as many women as men had registered to vote, while a thriving black market in voting cards has appeared with cards being bought and sold by the thousands for £6 to £18 each.

=== Systemic conflicts of interest ===
Government workers, required to be impartial in the election, were found by election observers to have actively and illegally campaigned for candidates. Investigators have also found members of political parties occupying positions as election officials.

The most problematic conflict of interest may be the fact that the country's Independent Elections Commission (IEC) that oversees the whole election is not "independent" of the Karzai administration at all. All seven of its members were appointed to the commission by Hamid Karzai, and its chairman, a former Karzai advisor in Herat province, has reportedly made no secret of his partisan support for the incumbent president.

In the days following the election, Karzai's main challenger, Dr. Abdullah Abdullah, denounced the chairman of the IEC as working for Mr. Karzai. Foreign election observers have also criticized the Independent Election Commission as being full of Karzai appointees.

The BBC has reported that the Independent Election Commission has been accused of not doing enough to prevent abuses that have been brought to its attention.

FEFA, the country's largest independent election monitoring organization, has also raised questions about the impartiality of Independent Election Commission (IEC) local officials, and noted that questions about IEC impartiality constituted "a trend that has persisted throughout the electoral process". Throughout election day, numerous reports were received of local IEC officials improperly interfering in the voting process.

U.S.-based Human Rights Watch said the independence of the Independent Election Commission was compromised by Karzai's appointment of the IEC chairman without parliamentary oversight and accused the IEC chairman of displaying "clear bias".

=== Voting irregularities ===
Election day news included reports of widespread electoral fraud throughout the day. At one polling station in Nad-e-Ali, in the Helmand province, just over 400 people had voted by 1 p.m., but three hours later, the figure had apparently rose to some 1,200, despite that guards had hardly seen any voters. Election officials were later seen counting piles of ballot papers, without checking simply declaring the votes had been cast for Karzai.

As early as 8 a.m., only one hour after the polls had opened, officials at the U.S. embassy in Kabul were receiving complaints of fraud.

Ashraf Ghani, one of the presidential candidates and also reported as favoured by the U.S. for a "chief executive" position to run the country regardless of the election outcome, e-mailed U.S. officials with reports of his opponents stuffing election ballot boxes. Other candidates also lodged similar complaints with U.S. officials – who referred them instead to the national election body.

Abdullah, the main opponent to Hamid Karzai in the presidential election, said that his supporters were lodging complaints of election fraud, in particular from Kandahar province. Hours after the polls closed, his deputy campaign manager, Saleh Mohammad Registani, alleged that "very large scale" fraud had taken place in at least three of the country's 34 provinces, including ballot box stuffing.

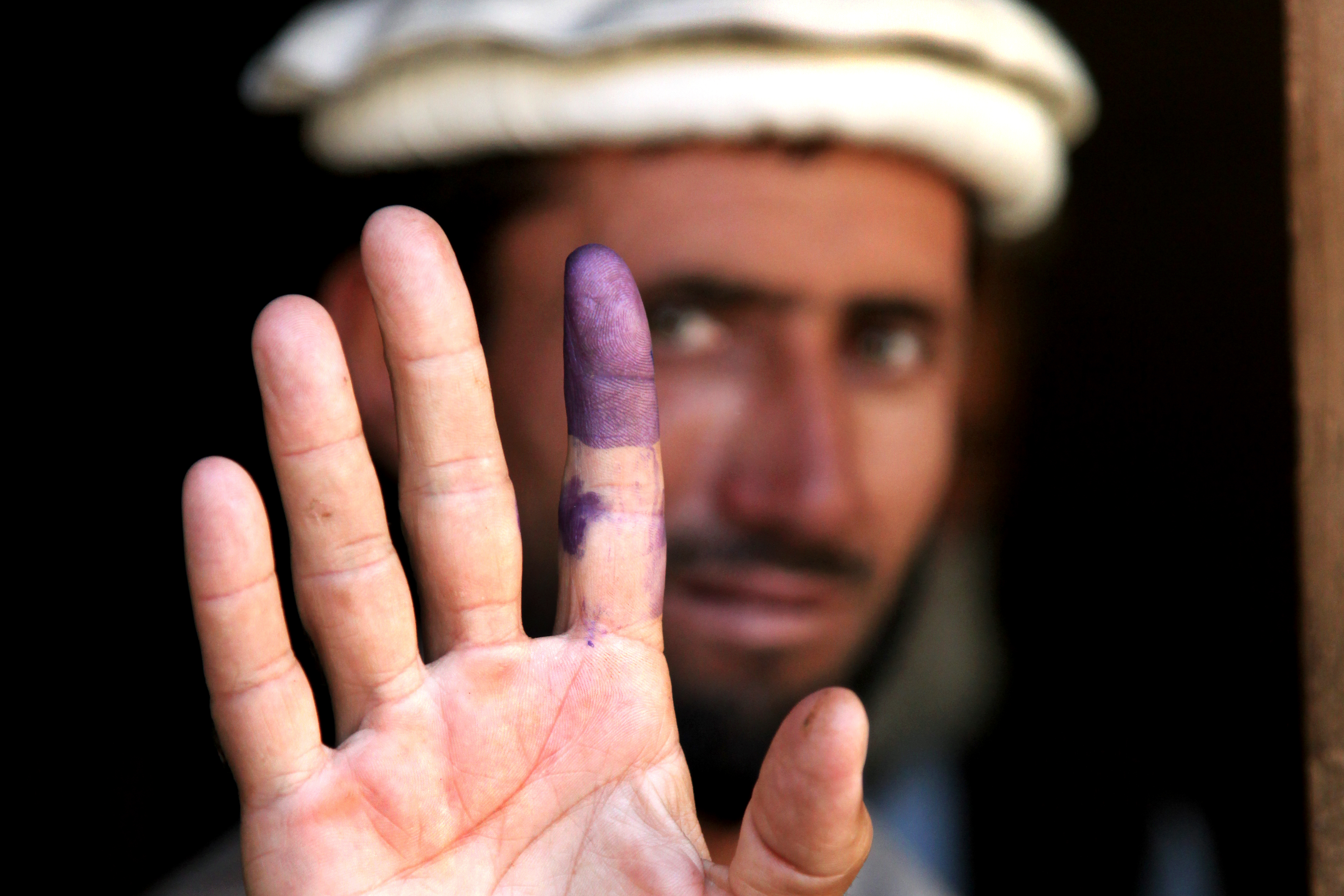
An Afghan man showing his inked finger, which was part of the procedure to prevent people from voting twice.

Presidential candidate Mirwais Yasini, the deputy speaker of the lower house of parliament, lodged 31 complaints with Afghanistan's Independent Election Commission (IEC), telling the BBC that both main camps had engaged in widespread electoral fraud.

Election monitor group FEFA reported receiving cases throughout the voting day of "improper interference" by local Independent Election Commission (IEC) staff in the voting process, raising continued concerns about the impartiality of IEC election officials. Their post-election provisional report also detailed cases of election officials being ejected from polling stations by representatives of candidates.

Photojournalist Peter Nicholls of The Times photographically documented an apparent case of ballot box stuffing amid low voter turnout in Pul-e-Charkhi, in Kabul province.

In a further irregularity, the supposedly indelible ink used to mark the index finger of voters to prevent voting more than once was found to be easily removable in many instances – a repeat of a problem that had also occurred in the 2004 and 2005 elections. According to Havana Marking, director of a documentary on the elections, by 9 a.m. people were bleaching their fingers and casting ballots twice. The documentary makers filmed "a cafe full of young men laughing and deciding who to vote for the second time".

Complaints about the ink were made by the camps of all three of the main challengers in the presidential race. Aides to Dr. Abdullah reported that at the polling station where he had cast his ballot, voters had been able to clean the ink from their fingertips within minutes. Ashraf Ghani's team had reports of inferior ink that was easily removed being used in the western city of Herat. Presidential candidate and former planning minister Dr. Ramazan Bashardost charged that the indelible ink could be washed off easily, and lodged an official complaint endorsed by a member of the Election Complaints Commission. The former minister, who had been running third in the pre-election polls, said: "This is not an election. This is a comedy."

== Flawed election ==
Western officials conceded the election would be flawed, admitting that there had been election corruption, that there was apathy, that the lack of security would stop some from voting, and that precautions designed to prevent fraud would be ineffective in many parts of the country where election monitors cannot go.

The international community accepted that fraud would be inevitable in the presidential election, but hoped that it could be minimised to an "acceptable level where it will not alter the final result".

Former U.S. Ambassador to Afghanistan Ronald E. Neumann put the odds of an election that would appear "good enough" at "50-50".

Additionally, 7 million fewer Afghans were even allowed to vote than in the last election. Thousands of complaints were filed, and there was blatant evidence of corruption.

== Low voter turnout ==
NATO officials announced in March 2009 that 15.6 million voters had registered to vote, roughly half of the country's population, and that 35 to 38 percent of registered voters were women. Those registration numbers were disputed, however, by the Free and Fair Election Foundation of Afghanistan and media reports, which suggested widespread fraudulent activity in the election process.

While UN, American and Afghan officials quickly hailed the election as a success, evidence from observers on the ground and from journalists suggested that the Taliban had succeeded in deterring many Afghans from voting.

At the end of the voting day, top election official Zekria Barakzai estimated the voter turnout across the country at around 40–50%. One Western diplomat slapped aside 50 percent as a "joke". On August 21, The New York Times article reported that overall turnout was expected to be about 40%. On August 26, The Daily Telegraph reported that turnout may have been little more than 35% nationwide and was less than 10% in some districts of Helmand and Kandahar.

Figures released by the IEC on August 31, when the ballots from almost half of the country's polling stations had been counted, pointed to a turnout of only 30% to 35%. Most of the ballots counted to that point were from the north of the country.

Independent election observers in the country almost all agreed that voter turnout was far lower than in the previous presidential election in 2004.

The turnout was uneven across the country with low turnout in the south and east of Afghanistan, suppressed by lack of security and disenchantment, while vote participation was somewhat higher in the more stable north and west of the country, including some reports of long lines of voters seen outside polling stations.

Voter turnout in the eastern city of Jalalabad was low at no more than 20–30%, according to election observer Tim Fairbank: "A lot of people have told us they were afraid to vote, and afraid to have their fingers dipped in ink because of the Taliban's threats." The government, on the other hand, was expected to claim that it was more like 60% in the area.

In the Pashtun-dominated southern provinces, turnout was as low as 5–10%, according to one Western official. In some parts of the country almost no women voted.

In Khan Neshin, Helmand province, in the south of Afghanistan, election officials estimated that only 250 to 300 people – out of an estimated population of 35,000 to 50,000 in a region larger than Connecticut – showed up to vote at the single polling station available for the area. Not a single woman voted, according to the district governor, Massoud Ahmad Rassouli Balouch.

In Babaji district of Helmand province, where 10 British soldiers were killed in Operation Panther's Claw, a British offensive launched against insurgents a few weeks ahead of the elections, reports indicated that only about 150 people voted out of a population of 55,000. One election observer said no more than 15 people voted at the polling centre where he was based.

In another Helmand province district of 70,000 people, barely 500 people voted, while in one town of 2,000 residents, only 50 people voted.

Voter turnout in Kandahar city, Afghanistan's second largest city, was estimated to be down 40% from the previous election in 2004. Noor Ahmad, a resident of Zerai District, said: "The turnout is very low, perhaps less than 5 percent."

In the Spin Boldak district of Kandahar province, RFE/RL's Radio Free Afghanistan correspondent in Kandahar, Dawa Khan Meenapal, said that people voted heavily but overall turnout was lower than in past elections, and that participation by women was very low.

In Lashkargah, the provincial capital of Helmand, Mohammad Aliyas Daee, a Radio Free Afghanistan correspondent in Helmand, similarly reported that "the overall participation of women was negligible." Voter turnout, by one estimate, was at below 20% in the city, considered to be more secure than the rest of the province.

In the southeastern Uruzgan province, the deputy police chief, Mohammad Nabi, estimated the province-wide turnout to be less than 40%, saying that "people had no interest".

Voting in the capital city Kabul also appeared to have been depressed, with one estimate placing turnout at only 30%. Officials, witnesses, and journalists at several polling stations reported low participation numbers. Afghan journalist and research analyst, Abdulhadi Hairan, observed that the low voter turnout in Kabul resulted in reporters and cameramen having to wait nearly to midday before having enough voter interviews to send back to their news organizations. Dr. Abdullah Abdullah, Karzai's main opponent in the presidential election, called the low voter turnout in Kabul "unsatisfactory."

"The early information is that the turnout was very low in some provinces and at best was fair in others."

— Haroun Mir, director of Afghanistan's Centre for Research & Policy Studies

The polls in Afghanistan, originally scheduled to close at 4 p.m. after nine hours of voting, had been held open an hour longer in a last-minute decision by the Independent Election Commission.

=== Post-audit voter turnout figures ===
Official election monitors and the UN placed voter turnout in the election at only around 30–33%.

In a joint report with the Afghanistan Independent Human Rights Commission, issued October 21, 2009, after the release of the final certified election results for the August 20 vote, the United Nations Assistance Mission in Afghanistan stated:

"One third of registered voters, a figure which is significantly lower than the previous elections, are understood to have cast their ballots,"

The approximate quantity and guarded wording of the UN statement indicated a voter turnout of no higher than 33%.

The figures of the Independent Election Commission, adjusted for 1,065,031 votes discarded as fraudulent, indicate a voter turnout of 31.4%:

When the IEC released its September 16 uncertified final results with a total of 5,662,758 "valid votes", the IEC claimed a voter turnout of 38.7%.

Following the ECC's official audit findings, the IEC's October 21 final certified results for the August 20 election presented a total of 4,597,727 "valid votes". 1,065,031 votes or 18.8% of the votes had been invalidated between the IEC's September 16 results and its final certified results.

A proportional 18.8% reduction of the IEC's September 16 voter turnout figure of 38.7% gives a voter turnout figure of 31.4%.

In an article published October 21, 2009, in Foreign Policy magazine, J. Scott Carpenter, an official election observer for the August 20 vote, placed the voter turnout at 30%.

== Post-election vote count and investigations ==
=== August, allegations of fraud ===
Ballot counting began after the polls closed on August 20, with official preliminary results to be declared on September 3, official final results to be declared two weeks after that on September 17, and a run-off, if required, to be held within two weeks after that.

Within a day into the counting, however, the Karzai and Abdullah camps made claims of leading far enough to obtain a majority, and that a run-off vote would not be needed. Three days into the counting, reports suggested Karzai had been re-elected by a landslide, with early figures giving Karzai 72% and Abdullah 23%. The scale of such a win was expected to provoke accusations of vote-rigging. Many complaints were deemed by the ECC to have been on a scale large enough to have altered the outcome of the poll, with the most common being ballot box tampering. Other charges included intimidation of voters, failures of the "indelible ink", and interference in polling.

Abdullah accused Karzai of "stealing" the election and alleged widespread electoral fraud had been committed: "It was led by Mr Karzai. He knew. He knew that without this he cannot win, about that I have no doubt in my mind." A UN official said there would be no legitimacy if Karzai was proclaimed the outright winner, in an election that Afghanistan's international backers were desperate should be seen as legitimate: "If the international community say it is all wonderful, they lose further credibility and are associated with an illegitimate government."

By August 25, the ECC said it had received 1,157 complaints, with 54 categorized as "high priority" and material to the outcome. Some of the worst fraud may have occurred in Helmand province, according to allegations from two presidential candidates. A spokesman for Ashraf Ghani alleged large-scale ballot box stuffing in Lashkar Gah, the capital of the province. An aide to Dr. Abdullah accused election officials in Helmand of having doubled the real turnout figure – a claim that found some anectdotal support in changing figures given by the top local election official in Helmand, who told The Times on the day of the election that fewer than 50,000 people had voted in the province, then changed the number to 110,000, and then to 150,000 in subsequent days. A UN official predicted that 10-20%, of all ballots were illegal, and even proposed that negotiations would have to be made to "massage down" Karzai's victory margin.

The deputy speaker of Afghanistan's lower house of parliament, Mirwais Yasini, claimed thousands of ballots cast for him had been removed from ballot boxes by opponents and taken away to be destroyed. He displayed bags full of ballots from Kandahar that had been discovered by his supporters. Yasini said the only option available was to "abolish the election". Abdullah also brought forth evidence to support his allegations of widespread vote-rigging. He showed sealed ballot forms that he similarly claimed were votes for him that were never counted; a vote ledger sheet from a polling station that listed only a few names, yet had a ballot tally on the bottom of 1,600; video showing ballot-stuffing that he said was recorded on August 22 – two days after the polls had closed and ballot boxes were supposed to have been sealed; video of an individual directing voters to cast their ballot for Karzai; a photo allegedly showing Karzai people looking over the shoulders of voters filling their ballot sheets behind the cardboard voting screens; a thick tablet of ballot sheets still affixed to the pad, with every single ballot apparently pre-marked for Karzai with the same pen and by what seemed to be the same hand. Abdullah said the tablet had been turned over to them in southern Afghanistan and was just one of hundreds. He said: "This amount of fraud ... Even I did not anticipate it. I was shocked."

More than 10 boxes of ballots were lost when a U.S. Air Force Chinook helicopter accidentally dropped and lost ballot boxes collected from a remote village.

==== Partial results ====
On August 26, the Independent Electoral Commission (IEC) reported partial results from 10% of polling stations, and announced it planned to release partial results each day for the next several days.

=== September, massive fraud alleged, sample-based audit ===
According to a Western diplomat, hundreds of thousands of ballots for Karzai were from as many as 800 fake polling sites where no one had voted. The diplomat and another Western official sai Karzai supporters took over approximately 800 actual polling centers on election day and used them to fraudulently report tens of thousands of ballots for Karzai. The Western diplomat said: "This was fraud en masse." In Karzai's home province, Kandahar, preliminary results indicated more than 350,000 ballots had been turned in to be counted, but Western officials estimated only about 25,000 people had actually voted in the whole province.

According to an IEC official and Western official in Afghanistan, the Independent Election Commission introduced a set of standards to exclude questionable votes on August 29, but when it appeared that the new exclusions would put Karzai's tally below 50%, the commission cast a second vote on September 7 to loosen the fraud standards.

On September 8, the Electoral Complaints Commission (ECC), dominated by U.N.-appointed Westerners, reported that over 720 major fraud allegations considered material to the outcome had been registered, and ordered recounts at polling stations where it had found "clear and convincing evidence of fraud" in at least three provinces. The U.N.-appointed ECC chairman, Grant Kippen, said voting irregularities included unfolded ballots (that would not have fit through a ballot box slot), identically marked ballots, and overly large ballot counts, including a box in Kandahar with 1,700 ballots when the maximum should be 600. Dozens of voting sites tallied by the Independent Election Commission reportedly had Karzai winning in perfectly round numbers like 200, 300, or 500 ballots. With the IEC releasing the first partial results to show Hamid Karzai above the 50% threshold, the U.S. State Department called for a "rigorous vetting" of the electoral fraud claims.

On September 10, the ECC ordered the invalidation of tens of thousands of ballots, mostly votes for Karzai, from 83 polling stations from three provinces. These included all presidential ballots from 5 polling stations in Paktika Province, either all presidential ballots, all provincial council ballots - or in some case both - from 27 polling stations in Ghazni Province, as well as ballots from 51 polling stations in Kandahar Province. The chairman of the ECC, Grant Kippen, said there would be no re-voting and that the ballots would simply discounted from the final tally. A source at the ECC indicated this was just the beginning of a process, according to a BBC correspondent.

On September 15, the foreign-dominated ECC ordered a recount of 2,600, or 10%, of the country's 26,000 polling stations – many of them in southern Afghanistan – a move expected to strip votes away from Karzai. Because many of those polling stations had substantially higher turnouts than average, possibly the result of ballot stuffing, more than 10% of the vote could be affected. With the September 12 partial results showing Karzai at 54% of the votes, just 4 points above the 50% threshold, the ECC-ordered recount could potentially force a run-off election.

On September 21, 2009, over a month after the election day, and after several weeks of wrangling, it was reported that the IEC and ECC had agreed to rely on statistical sampling in the interests of expediency instead of carrying out an in-depth investigation of all the alleged voting irregularities.

Supporters of the deal claimed that streamlining the complaints review process would reduce political instability. Critics of the deal said that bypassing a full investigation of all the irregularities would undermine faith in the credibility of the outcome.

On September 25, the IEC and ECC announced that they had agreed to audit and recount ballots from only 313 of the 3,063 polling stations that had been deemed suspicious, representing a sample of about 10% of suspect ballot boxes, in order to expedite a resolution to the disputed election. According to the election officials, the 313 ballot boxes to be used in the statistical sampling were randomly selected in front of candidate agents and observers, and were to be retrieved from the provinces as soon as the next day.

News sources reported the IEC as urging the Electoral Complaints Commission to expedite their fraud investigations, saying that the final results must be released within the next ten days if the election commission is to be able to prepare a second round of voting before winter snow at the end of October makes voting impossible in parts of the country. Missing the window could delay any run-off until springtime, creating a power vacuum.

==== September 12 partial results ====
The IEC had previously announced that it hoped to release full preliminary results, on September 12, instead. On that date, however, they announced that the count was still not complete and that there would be another delay, with no date known. The partial results released by the IEC on September 12, tallied from the ballots of 93% of polling stations, showed Karzai slightly further in the lead and Abdullah slightly further lagging:

The day was accompanied by a spate of violence in which at least 66 people were killed in gunbattles, suicide strikes, and roadside bombs. The dead included 24 civilians, 5 foreign soldiers, 7 Afghan soldiers, 12 Afghan policemen, 7 security firm guards, and at least 11 militants. Attacks occurred in all corners of the country – not only in the south and east, but also in the west and north that had been comparatively quiet until recent weeks around the election – signalling an expanding insurgency despite record numbers of U.S. and coalition troops in the eight-year war since the 2001 U.S. invasion.

==== September 16 uncertified final result ====
On September 16, the IEC released its final uncertified results, with Karzai winning the election in one round with 54.6%:

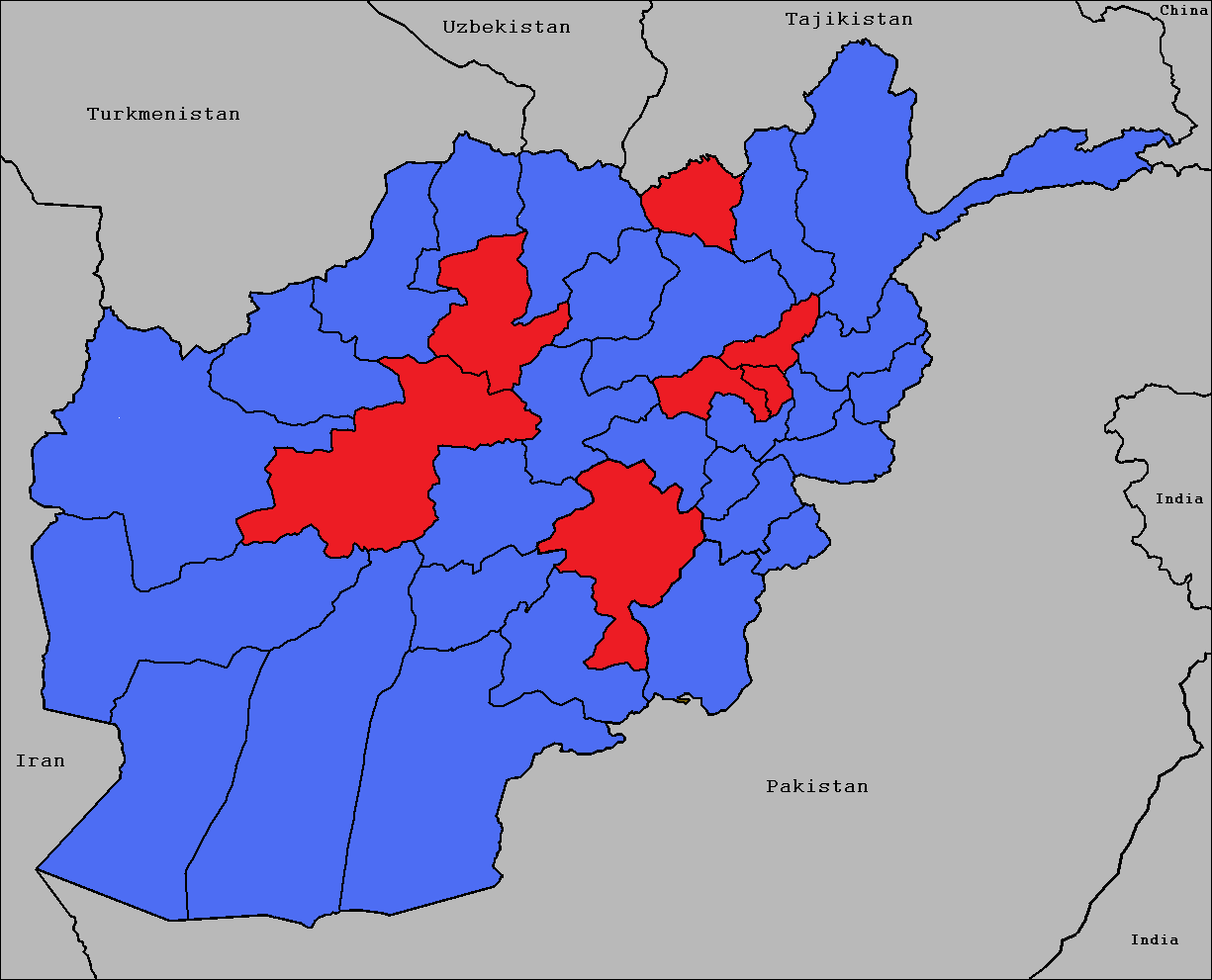
Provinces where Hamid Karzai won a majority (in blue), provinces were Abdullah Abdullah won a majority (in red)

- Hamid Karzai – 3,093,256 votes, 54.6%
- Abdullah Abdullah – 1,571,581 votes, 27.8%
- Ramazan Bashardost – 520,627 votes, 9.2%
- Ashraf Ghani – 155,343–2.7%

Total Valid Votes: 5,662,758.

The IEC claimed that voter turnout was 38.7%. However, anectdotal evidence from observers suggests it was much lower.

The results were not final until approved by the UN-dominated Electoral Complaints Commission (ECC) which had already previously called for recounts at about 10% of polling stations, a process which could take months.

More than 2,800 complaints were registered with the ECC, including complaints involving polling day and the ballot counting process, with 726 allegations that the ECC categorized as serious enough to have affected the outcome. The EU deputy chief observer, Dimitra Ioannou, alleged that 1.5 million ballots were suspect out of the 5.5 million ballots, representing 27% of the vote. According to Ioannou, 1.1 million of the votes for Karzai were suspect, along with 300,000 of the votes for Abdullah, and 92,000 of the votes for Bashardost. The EU deputy chief observer noted that if all the votes they deemed suspect were invalidated, Karzai's percentage would drop from 54.6% to 46%, while Abdullah's would rise from 27.7% to 31%, effectively forcing a run-off. The Karzai campaign denounced the announcement as "partial, irresponsible and in contradiction with Afghanistan's constitution."

The European Union election observer mission had previously declared the election process to be generally "good and fair", shortly after voting day.

The figures alleged by the EU deputy chief observer represented approximately 36%, 19%, and 18% of the votes counted for Karzai, Abdullah, and Bashardost, respectively. Invalidating the 1.5 million ballots would reduce the already low voter turnout figure to under 27%.

=== October, ruling of the ECC awaited, run-off possibility ===
The timeframes mentioned at the end of September for a decision about a run-off did not appear to hold however: The recount of the random sample of 10% of suspect ballot boxes finally only began nine days later, on October 5. On October 11, the recount of the 10% sample of suspect ballot boxes was reported to be completed, with results to be announced within a few days. The head of the United Nations mission in Afghanistan, Kai Eide, stated that vote fraud in the Afghan election had been "widespread". He refused to reveal any numbers however, saying "any specific figures would be speculative".

On October 12, just days before results of the audit were expected to be announced, the chairman of the Electoral Complaints Commission (ECC), Canadian Grant Kippen, told reporters that the ECC had misinterpreted the statistical analysis to determine the percentage of votes that would be voided for each candidate in ballot boxes deemed suspect. The week before, the ECC had stated that each candidate would lose votes in proportion to the number of fraudulent ballots cast for them in a random sampling of ballots boxes deemed suspect. Under the new ECC interpretation, the commission divides suspect ballot stations into six categories of reason for suspicion, and disqualifies the same percentage from each candidate's total ballots within each category. According to an Associated Press article: "That means votes legitimately cast for a candidate could be canceled if they were found in ballot boxes that were deemed to have been stuffed in favor of another contender."

On the same day, in a blow for the UN-backed complaints body's credibility, one of the two Afghan members of the five-member ECC resigned, stating "foreign interference" on the part of the three Western members – an American, a Canadian, and a Dutch – of the complaints body.

==== Waiting game and Western political pressure ====
On October 17, the U.N.-backed Electoral Complaints Commission, which had been expected to release its findings from its statistics-based audit, delayed the announcement again as ECC officials spent the day in meetings with Afghan election officials and double-checking calculations – and as U.S. and other Western officials pressured Karzai and Abdullah to state their acceptance of the findings before the ECC announcement and to work out a power-sharing deal.

Karzai fielded a flurry of visits and phone calls from U.S. and other Western officials pressing him to accept the delayed U.N.-led audit results, enter into a power-sharing deal with Abdullah, or otherwise avert a crisis in the contended election. Among the American officials working the phones were Secretary of State Hillary Clinton, her Special Representative for Afghanistan and Pakistan Richard C. Holbrooke, and Defense Secretary Robert M. Gates. In Afghanistan, U.S. Senator John Kerry, chairman of the United States Senate Committee on Foreign Relations, met with Karzai at least twice, and Abdullah once, stressing "the necessity of a legitimate outcome," British Prime Minister Gordon Brown and U.N. Secretary-General Ban Ki-moon also called Karzai and Abdullah. French foreign minister Bernard Kouchner, who had flown to Afghanistan "in the context of tension" caused by the election crisis, pressured both Karzai and Abdullah to "respect" the U.N.-backed audit process.

The spokesman for Karzai's campaign, Wahid Omar, said they were concerned that the process was "being overshadowed by political discussions." Karzai's spokesman stated:

"We will not be committed to a result that is decided on politically."

On October 18 the Telegraph reported that the ECC investigation was "understood" to have knocked Karzai's vote percentage down to between 47% and 49%, but that the official result "was delayed as the West asked the men to reach an agreement that would avoid another round of voting."

White House Chief of Staff Rahm Emanuel indicated in veiled criticism of Karzai that it would be 'reckless' for the U.S. to commit more troops to Afghanistan until there is a 'true partner' to work with in Kabul. An expert familiar with the U.S. administration's thinking said there was no stomach for an election run-off after the "organisational headaches and risks to American troops" experienced in the August 20 ballot, and stated: "There is a clear preference for a deal."

==== ECC fraud investigation findings reported to IEC ====
On October 19, The New York Times reported that the ECC submitted its findings to the IEC that day, leaving the official announcement of results to the Independent Election Committee. However, an unnamed Western official said that the ECC investigation gave Karzai only 48% of the vote, under the 50% threshold required to avoid a run-off. The sample-based audit was reported to have found levels of fraud ranging from 71% to 96% in the six categories into which suspect ballot boxes had been divided.

Karzai campaign spokesman Wahid Omar stated: "I don't think we can make any judgment based on the figures announced today." The New York Times reported that based on its analysis using preliminary data from the ECC findings, 874,000, or 28%, of Karzai's 3,093,000 votes were ordered invalidated by the sample-based fraud audit, as were 185,000, or 18%, of Abdullah's votes. The ECC also completely discarded 210 ballot boxes because of fraud, reducing Karzai's total by 41,000 votes and Abdullah's by 10,807 votes. The ECC findings resulted in pushing Karzai's final vote total from 54% down to around 48–49%, and raising Abdullah's vote total from 28% up to 31%.

According to an article by The Times, overall, "some 1.26 million recorded votes were excluded from an election that cost the international community more than $300 million." The New York Times wrote, "fraud was so pervasive that nearly a quarter of all votes were thrown out.".

Concerns that Karzai might reject the ECC findings in direct conflict with his main backer for eight years, the United States, led to continued intense American and ally pressure on him to accept a power-sharing deal or face a second round run-off. Senator John Kerry made an unplanned stop in Kabul to meet Karzai in the presidential palace "to continue his discussions and consultations", according to the U.S. embassy. White House spokesperson Robert Gibbs said former U.S. army general Karl Eikenberry, the U.S. ambassador to Afghanistan, was engaged in "delicate but extremely important" efforts to persuade Karzai to accept the ECC's findings.

U.S. Secretary of State Hillary Clinton, who said that she had spoken a number of times with Karzai, announced that Karzai would be making an announcement the next day, saying "He is going to announce his intentions ... But I don't want to pre-empt in any way President Karzai's statement, which will set the stage for how we go forward in the next stage of this." An unnamed diplomatic source also said that Karzai would be making a nationwide address flanked by U.S. Senator John Kerry and U.N. Special Representative to Afghanistan Kai Eide, and claimed that Karzai was prepared to make concessions, such as forming a power-sharing coalition or agreeing to a run-off. However, according to The Times, one of Karzai's senior cabinet ministers, Ismail Khan, who had met with Karzai, said he had been told that a formal challenge will be issued: "He said he will complain against the ECC decision, and demand an investigation into why they cut his votes."

==== Acquiescence to a run-off on November 7 ====
On October 20 under heavy U.S. and ally pressure, Karzai announced his acquiescence to a run-off in the election. Flanked at a news conference by U.S. Senator John Kerry, the head of the powerful United States Senate Committee on Foreign Relations, and Kai Eide, the U.N. Special Representative to Afghanistan, he announced a run-off to be held on November 7, stating: "Unfortunately, the election of Afghanistan was defamed. Any result that we were getting out of it was not able to bring legitimacy."

Karzai had initially indicated that he might reject the Western-dominated ECC's findings. According to The New York Times, Karzai's capitulation came after "all-out push" by U.S. officials and their European allies. In a meeting hastily arranged after the release of the ECC ruling the previous day, U.S. Senator Kerry and the U.S. ambassador Lt. Gen. Karl W. Eikenberry were at the presidential palace in Kabul. Karzai initially hesitated but ended up agreeing to accept the findings during the course of the two-hour meeting.

Besides Senator Kerry and General Eikenberry, Karzai was pushed hard by U.S. Secretary of State Hillary Clinton, who urged him in multiple calls over the last few days to be a "statesman" and accept the results, and by British Prime Minister Gordon Brown, who called Karzai three times in 48 hours, warning him that he could lose Western support if he did not accede to a second round. Chiming in as well, Canadian Prime Minister Stephen Harper also called to warn Karzai that he would face dire problems with the coalition countries involved in Afghanistan if he did not cooperate. The American, British, and French ambassadors to Afghanistan joined U.S. Senator Kerry and the U.N.'s Kai Eide in flanking Karzai as he made his announcement at the news conference. U.S. administration officials had also used President Obama's pending strategy review on Afghanistan as leverage on Karzai, indicating that they would not make a decision on adding troops until Karzai agreed to accept the election outcome.

A senior Western official was quoted in an article by The Times as saying: "No one wants a second round. It'll be expensive, bloody, and probably fraudulent."

According to The Times, the certified results after the audit findings had left Karzai with 49.67% of the vote, just 0.33% below the 50% threshold to have avoided the run-off.

==== October 21 certified final result ====
On October 21, following the ECC's official audit findings and Karzai's heavily pressured acquiescence to a run-off, the IEC released its final certified results for the August 20 vote:

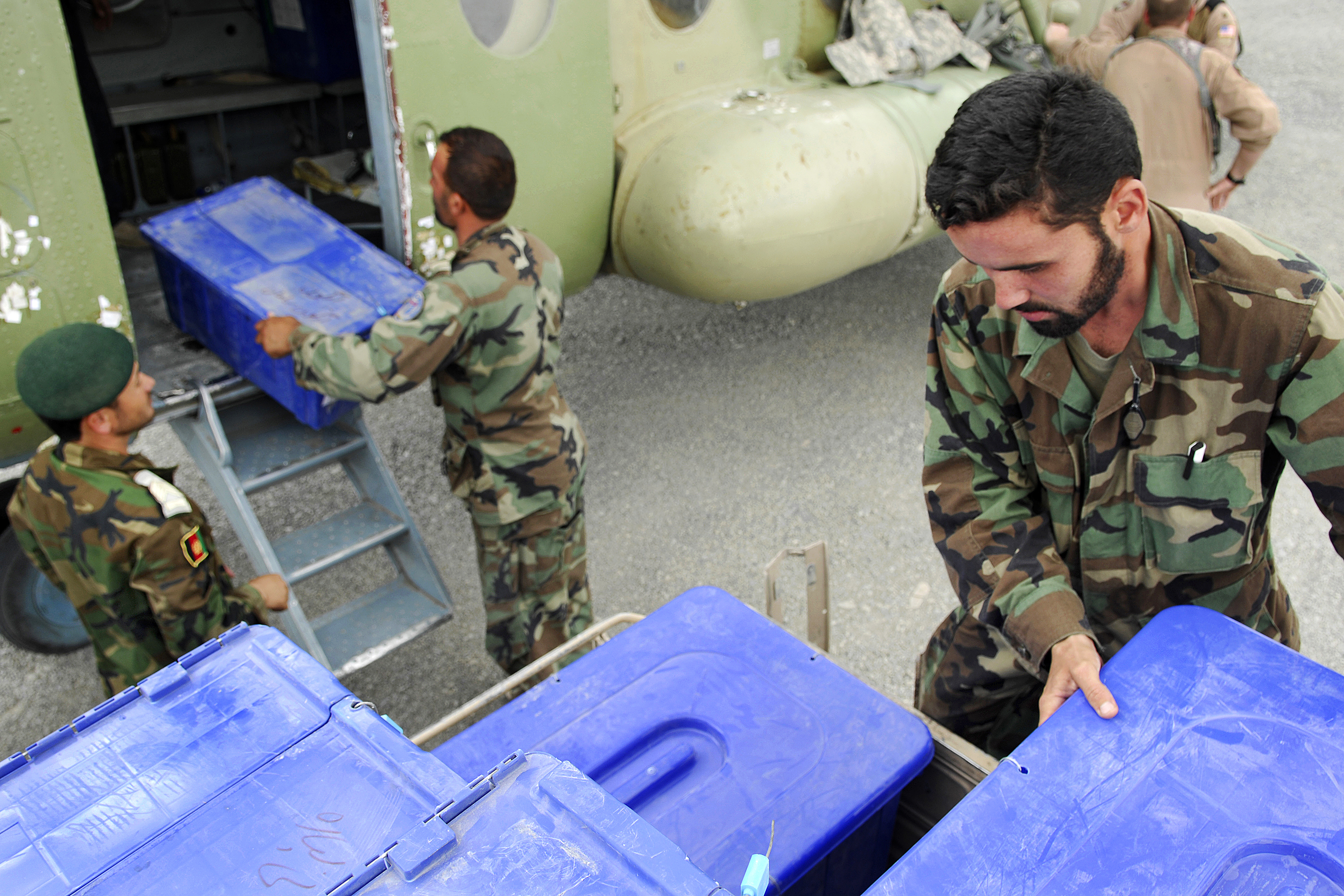
Soldiers of the Afghan National Army unloading election ballots at U.S. Forward Operating Base Orgun-E on August 16, 2009.

| Candidate | Party | Votes | % |
|---|---|---|---|
| Hamid Karzai | Independent | 2,283,907 | 49.67 |
| Abdullah Abdullah | National Coalition | 1,406,242 | 30.59 |
| Ramazan Bashardost | Independent | 481,072 | 10.46 |
| Ashraf Ghani Ahmadzai | Independent | 135,106 | 2.94 |
| Mirwais Yasini | Independent | 47,511 | 1.03 |
| Shahnawaz Tanai | Afghanistan Peace Movement | 29,648 | 0.64 |
| Frozan Fana | Independent | 21,512 | 0.47 |
| Abdul Salam Rocketi | Independent | 19,997 | 0.43 |
| Habib Mangal | Independent | 18,746 | 0.41 |
| Motasim Billah Mazhabi | Independent | 18,248 | 0.40 |
| Abdul Latif Pedram | National Congress Party | 15,462 | 0.34 |
| Mohammad Sarwar Ahmadzai | Independent | 14,273 | 0.31 |
| Sayed Jalal Karim | Independent | 13,489 | 0.29 |
| Shahla Atta | Independent | 10,687 | 0.23 |
| Mahbob-U-lah Koshani | Afghanistan Liberal Party | 10,255 | 0.22 |
| Alhaj Abdul Ghafor Zori | Independent | 9,286 | 0.20 |
| Rahim Jan Shinzad | Independent | 7,197 | 0.16 |
| Zabih-U-llah Ghazi Noristani | Justice and Development Party | 6,284 | 0.14 |
| Abdul Jabar Sabet | Independent | 6,190 | 0.13 |
| Mohammad Hashem Taufiqui | Independent | 5,043 | 0.11 |
| Bismillah Shir | Independent | 4,550 | 0.10 |
| Ghulam Faroq Nijrabi | Independent | 4,528 | 0.10 |
| Abdul Hasib Arian | Independent | 4,472 | 0.10 |
| Moin-ul-din Ulfati | Independent | 3,518 | 0.08 |
| Gul Ahmmad Yama | Independent | 3,221 | 0.07 |
| Ghulam Mohammad Rigi | Independent | 3,180 | 0.07 |
| Mohammad Akbar Oria | Independent | 2,991 | 0.07 |
| Bashir Ahmad Bizhan | Kangara Afghanistan National Party | 2,457 | 0.05 |
| Sangin Mohammad Rahmani | Independent | 2,434 | 0.05 |
| Hedayat Amin Arsala | National Islamic Front | 2,346 | 0.05 |
| Abdul Majid Samim | Independent | 2,198 | 0.05 |
| Zia-ul-haq Hafizi | Independent | 1,679 | 0.04 |
| Total | | 4,597,729 | 100.00 |
| Valid votes | | 4,597,729 | 95.33 |
| Invalid/blank votes | | 225,363 | 4.67 |
| Total votes | | 4,823,092 | 100.00 |
| Registered voters/turnout | | 15,295,016 | 31.53 |
Source: IEC, NDI

== November 7 run-off election ==
"It is hard to see how a second round can be credible."

— Rachel Reid, Human Rights Watch, October 22, 2009

On October 23, election authorities, with UN assistance, began delivering ballots for the November 7 run-off. UN planes flew ballots and voting kits to provincial capitals from where they would be delivered to thousands of polling stations by helicopter, truck, women and donkey.

Because of insecurity and fraud concerns, 7,000 polling stations – nearly 30% of the 24,000 polling stations that had been set up for the August 20 vote – were cut for the run-off vote.

There were also concerns that voter turnout for the run-off could be even lower than the "anemic" turnout of 30–33% in the first round on August 20.

According to Gilles Dorronsoro, a visiting scholar at the Carnegie Endowment and an expert on Afghanistan and South Asia: "This time around, the weather will be worse, and the plain fact is, most Afghans don’t like their options enough to vote."

The UN told the IEC that 200 of its 380 district election chiefs in the first round had ignored procedures or been complicit in fraud and must not be hired again.

"The international community cannot expect Afghans to risk their lives to participate in a sham election."

— J. Scott Carpenter, The Washington Institute for Near East Policy, an official election observer during the first round

The run-off campaign period formally opened on October 24. Abdullah's campaign called for the dismissal of the three top officials of the Independent Election Commission (IEC), accusing them of having allowed widespread fraud in the first round of the election.

Both run-off candidates were reported to be frantically wooing Ramazan Bashardost, the presidential candidate that had placed third in the August 20 first round vote.

Bashardost, who had campaigned against the corruption and greed of Kabul politicians and against the poverty of Afghans, said he had not decided who to support between the two – if anyone – saying the choice was between "the worst, and worse than the worst."

The Taliban reiterated their call for Afghans to boycott the election, denouncing it as a foreign-orchestrated sham.

On October 26, Abdullah called again for the sacking of Azizullah Lodin, the head of the Independent Election Commission, saying that he had "no credibility". Karzai rejected the call by Abdullah, stating "the changes would not be helpful to the elections and the country".

=== Abdullah withdrawal from the run-off vote ===
On November 1, 2009, Abdullah Abdullah announced that he was withdrawing from the run-off vote, saying "I will not participate in the November 7 election," because his demands for changes in the electoral commission had not been met, and a "transparent election is not possible." Hamid Karzai had rejected Abdullah's demand that the head of the IEC resign.

Abdullah also said the Afghan people should not accept results of an election from the current election commission, and stated that Karzai's government had not been legitimate since its mandate expired in May 2009.

Speculation immediately followed that the run-off election would be cancelled. Afghanistan was thrown into a crisis after the withdrawal of Abdullah, which in effect cleared the way for Karzai to retain power despite the accusations of fraud. A weakened Karzai administration, shorn of electoral legitimacy, would represent a major blow to the Western allies who considered to send more troops to fight the Taliban.

=== Run-off cancelled and winner declared ===
The next day, on November 2, officials from the Independent Election Commission announced the cancellation of the November 7 run-off and declared Hamid Karzai the winner by default. According to The New York Times, the Afghan election commission and Karzai had been under intense pressure from the United States and its allies to cancel the run-off. Abdullah said the appointment had "no legal basis" and Afghans deserved a better government. He stated:

"A government that is appointed by an illegitimate commission, a commission that has tainted its own legitimacy, cannot bring the rule of law to the country, it cannot fight the corruption."

=== NDI data browser ===
On December 17, 2009, the National Democratic Institute opened up an Afghanistan election data browser to the public. This tool allows users to browse the raw vote count from the 2009 presidential election on a national view and quickly study details on lower (provincial, district, and even polling center) levels.

== Perceived U.S. interference ==
The United States is widely seen to have an enormous stake riding on the outcome of the election in Afghanistan. While U.S. officials have taken great pains to repeatedly assert neutrality, there are many perceptions and allegations of U.S. interference and manipulation in Afghanistan.

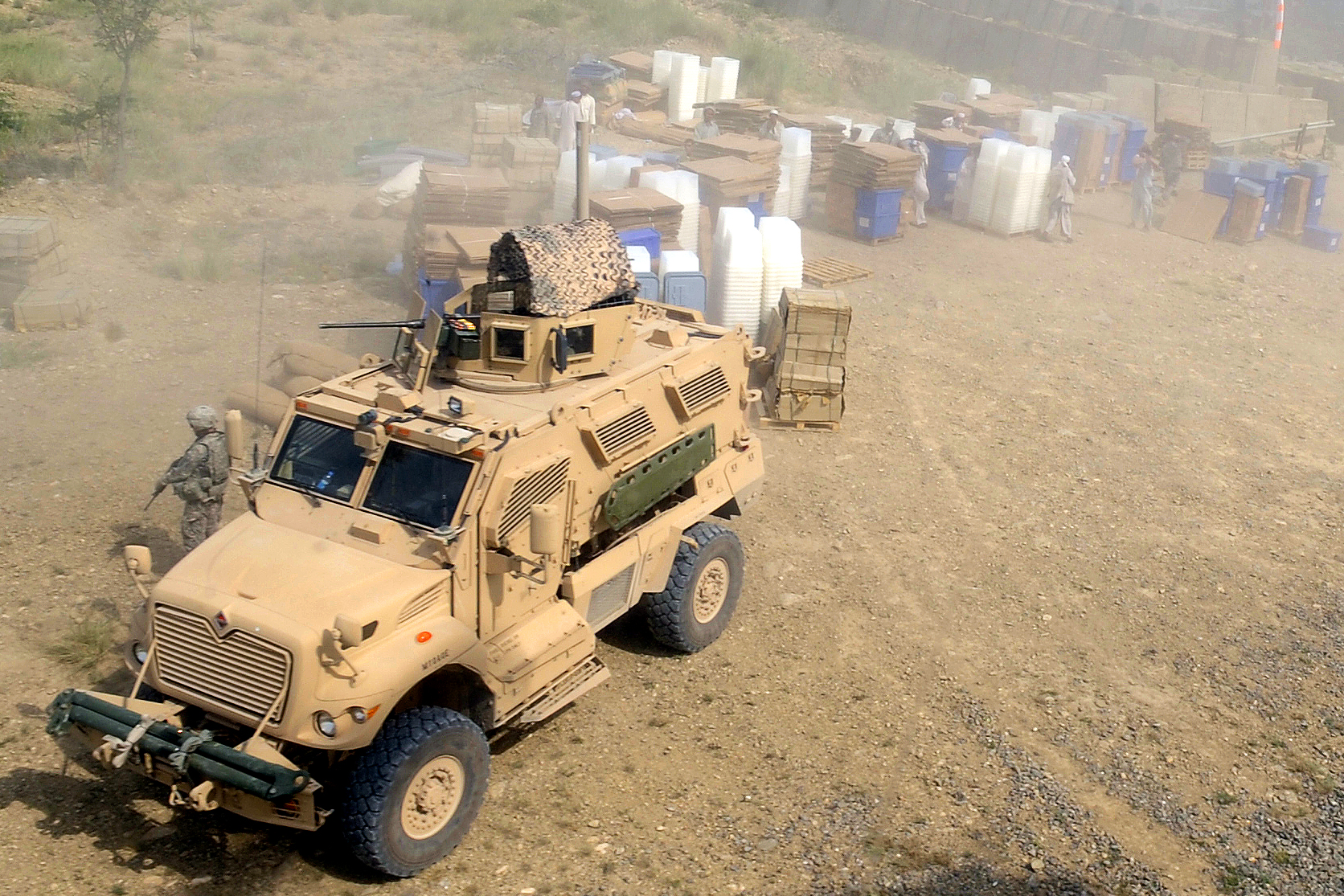
Armored US military trucks distributing ballot boxes.

Many in Afghanistan perceive the U.S. to have favoured Ashraf Ghani and Abdullah Abdullah over Hamid Karzai.

Four prominent Afghan politicians, including Ghani and Abdullah, were in attendance at U.S. President Obama's inauguration in January. Karzai, however, was not. Media reports began appearing that suggested that the U.S. was eager for a change at the top in Afghanistan. Hamid Karzai was also angered when the U.S. Ambassador to Afghanistan, Karl W. Eikenberry, appeared beside Ghani and Abdullah at news conferences in June, ahead of the election, though Eikenberry stressed impartiality in his remarks. After Karzai did not show up at the first televised debate – against Abdullah and Ghani – the U.S. ambassador to Afghanistan published an op-ed in The Washington Post calling for "serious debate among the candidates" in Afghanistan.

All these developments were viewed by many in Afghanistan as a message about which candidates the U.S. now preferred to have in power in Afghanistan.

""The U.S. has certainly tried to undermine Karzai's leadership."

— Haroun Mir, director of Afghanistan's Centre for Research & Policy Studies

Some of Karzai's rivals have alluded that Karzai is extremely concerned about foreign interference in Afghanistan.

"He considers everybody part of that big plot," Abdullah said. "In the meetings with elders and political leaders who have talked and spoken to me, he says this, 'We should unite. You know, there are plots, Americans, British,' and so on and so forth."

Both Abdullah Abdullah and Ashraf Ghani have told people privately that the United States gave them the green light to run for president, according to a former U.S. official in Afghanistan.

=== Allegations of U.S. manipulation ===
As the first installments of vote counting results were being released, about a week after election day, Ramazan Bashardost, who ran third in exit polls, contended that the U.S. was playing a role in manipulating the outcome, in order to use a contested situation for its plans to broker a deal among the leading candidates. Others have made the same contention.

A TIME article that came out just after the election did suggest that a contested election outcome could "suit the U.S. purpose."

Some support for Bashardost's allegation may be seen in the U.S.-funded pre-election polls, one conducted by what Gary Langer, director of polling at ABC News, described as "an outfit called Glevum Associates, which appears from its website to be a military contractor engaged in producing psychological operations data as part of a U.S. Army counterinsurgency program, the Human Terrain System," and the other by the International Republican Institute, a "pro-democracy group affiliated with the Republican Party and financed by the American government."

In their May 3–16, 2009 poll, the International Republican Institute found that Bashardost placed higher than Abdullah Abdullah and Ashraf Ghani in favorability amongst Afghans, and that Bashardost and Ghani both came in at the very same level of support, 3%, when Afghans were asked who they would vote for president in an open-ended question. Yet their July 16–26 survey asked a series of questions that quite specifically included Ghani, but left Bashardost out for some reason:

- "If the presidential race were among only three people - Hamid Karzai, Ashraf Ghani, and Abdulah Abdullah - which one would you vote for president?"
- "If there is a second round election and the candidates are Hamid Karzai and Abdullah Abdullah, for whom would you vote?"
- "If there is a second round election and the candidates are Hamid Karzai and Ashraf Ghani, for whom would you vote?"
- "Do you think a unified team of Abdullah and Ashraf Ghani is a good option for Afghanistan?"

=== New chief executive position ===
U.S. officials have also made clear, even before the election, that – regardless of who won the Afghan election – Washington planned to use the leverage of the military force and financial resources at its command to extensively reorganize the Afghan government according to U.S. plans. The U.S. would push for a new non-elected "Chief Executive" position to be inserted under the President, with the appointee taking over all the day-to-day operations of the country.

Ashraf Ghani has widely been characterized as the U.S. favourite for appointment to that position. (Another mention was Zalmay Khalilzad.) Ghani has had discussions with U.S. officials, including both the U.S. special envoy to Afghanistan, Richard Holbrooke, and the U.S. ambassador to Afghanistan, Karl Eikenberry, and has denied turning down the job offer. He told reporters a few days before the election: "I've been approached repeatedly; the offer is on the table. I have not accepted it."

Other plans by the U.S. Defense and State departments also call for the installation of American "mentors" and liaisons inside Afghan government ministries in Kabul, a policy that was heavily used in the early years of the U.S. military occupation of Iraq.

The powerful, non-elected "chief executive" position envisaged for insertion into the Afghan government was characterized by a senior White House official as "a prime minister, except not prime minister because he wouldn’t be responsible to a parliamentary system."

Afghan Foreign Minister Rangin Dadfar Spanta said that installing a "shadow prime-minister" would pose constitutional problems, but said: "I know that in Washington this idea has strong supporters."

=== U.S. efforts to force a run-off ===
The day after the election, a tense meeting took place between the U.S. special envoy to Afghanistan, Richard Holbrooke, and Afghan president Hamid Karzai, with sources describing the meeting as "a dramatic bust up" and "explosive". According to The Times, Holbrooke was already raising the possibility of a run-off, causing Karzai to accuse the U.S. special envoy of trying to force a second round "against the interests of Afghanistan".

The U.S. special envoy also met with Karzai's rival, Abdullah Abdullah, after the election. The discussion between Holbrooke and Karzai was said to have been noticeably briefer than Holbrooke's meeting with Abdullah.

On August 29, it was announced that the envoys from the United States, Britain, France, and Germany would meet in Paris to discuss the Afghan elections. According to The Times, a French official said that Holbrooke wanted a run-off in order to chasten Karzai and show him his power was limited.

Reacting to reports that the U.S. special envoy to Afghanistan wanted the vote to go to a second round for the sake of credibility, the IEC said the result is an Afghan issue:

"It is not up to Mr. Holbrooke to decide the first or the second round, this decision is up to the people of Afghanistan who have voted and the IEC is counting these votes."

On September 3, 2009, envoys from the United States, Britain, France, Germany, and other Western countries met in Paris to discuss the Afghan elections and how to rescue their costly efforts. The Paris meeting was seen as an effort to garner support for the U.S. response to the election and pressure Afghan President Hamid Karzai. The Western envoys to Afghanistan said to expect a run-off in the Afghan election, suggesting that one could occur if enough votes are invalidated.

The U.S., European, and NATO leaders also declared in their Paris meeting that their Western military troops were staying in Afghanistan.

In an interview with Le Figaro released on September 7, 2009, Hamid Karzai accused the United States of trying to undermine him in order to make him more malleable.

On September 13, 2009, the Sunday Telegraph reported that a "stormy meeting" between U.S. Ambassador to Afghanistan, former U.S. general Karl Eikenberry, and President Karzai had occurred the previous week. "Don't declare victory," warned the ambassador, on the instructions of Secretary of State Hillary Clinton. The Telegraph reported that the Afghan president had refused to meet American officials since then.

On September 15, 2009, the top U.S. diplomat to the United Nations mission in Afghanistan (UNAMA), Peter Galbraith, was reportedly ordered out of the country by the head of the mission, U.N. Special Representative to Afghanistan Kai Eide, following a heated disagreement over the American diplomat's demands for a wholesale recount that would virtually ensure a run-off. According to diplomatic sources, Galbraith – a close friend of the U.S. special envoy Richard Holbrooke – wanted the Independent Election Commission (IEC) to annul results from 1,000 of the nationwide total of about 6,500 polling centres and to recount results from another 5,000. Eide, on the other hand had been seeking only a recount of some 1,000 polling centres. UN officials suggested that Mr. Galbraith's position was representative of the U.S. stance, while Mr. Eide's echoed those of the European missions in Kabul.

According to The Times, the IEC were preparing on September 8 to announce results for the last 15% of ballots, mostly from the controversial areas of the south and Badghis province in the north that were expected to return big majorities for Karzai, when Galbraith stepped in and forced them not to announce those results.

At a meeting with IEC officials on September 13, Galbraith "laid into the commissioners, in front of the donors and observers" and demanded to know why they had not yet started printing ballot papers in preparation for a run-off.

On September 30, 2009, The Times reported that the U.S. diplomat was fired from the UN mission in Afghanistan. The UN Secretary-General, Ban Ki-moon, said he dismissed Galbraith "in the best interests of the mission" after the Karzai government had told the UN that it was unwilling to deal with the American in the future. The Times also revealed that UN Special Representative to Afghanistan Kai Eide had lobbied hard behind the scenes against the appointment of Galbraith as his deputy, but that the United States had pushed Ban Ki-moon to appoint Galbraith, a close friend and ally of Richard Holbrooke, the U.S. Special Envoy to Afghanistan and Pakistan.

In October 2009, numerous news articles, such as one by The New York Times and anotherby the Associated Press, described the extraordinary American efforts, in concert with allies, over multiple days to pressure Hamid Karzai into acceding to run-off vote. On October 20, caving in to the relentless U.S. arm-twisting, he reluctantly acquiesced.

=== U.S. efforts to force a power-sharing deal ===
On September 13, 2009, the Sunday Telegraph reported that American officials were making frantic efforts to force President Hamid Karzai into a power-sharing deal against his wishes, stating that "US officials have made little secret of their wish to see his wings clipped". In what one official in Kabul described as "turmoil" behind the scenes, Western diplomats were attempting to convert the election crisis into an opportunity for their purposes by forcing Karzai to share power in government with Dr. Abdullah Abdullah and "reformist ministers", and accept a diminished role for the presidency.

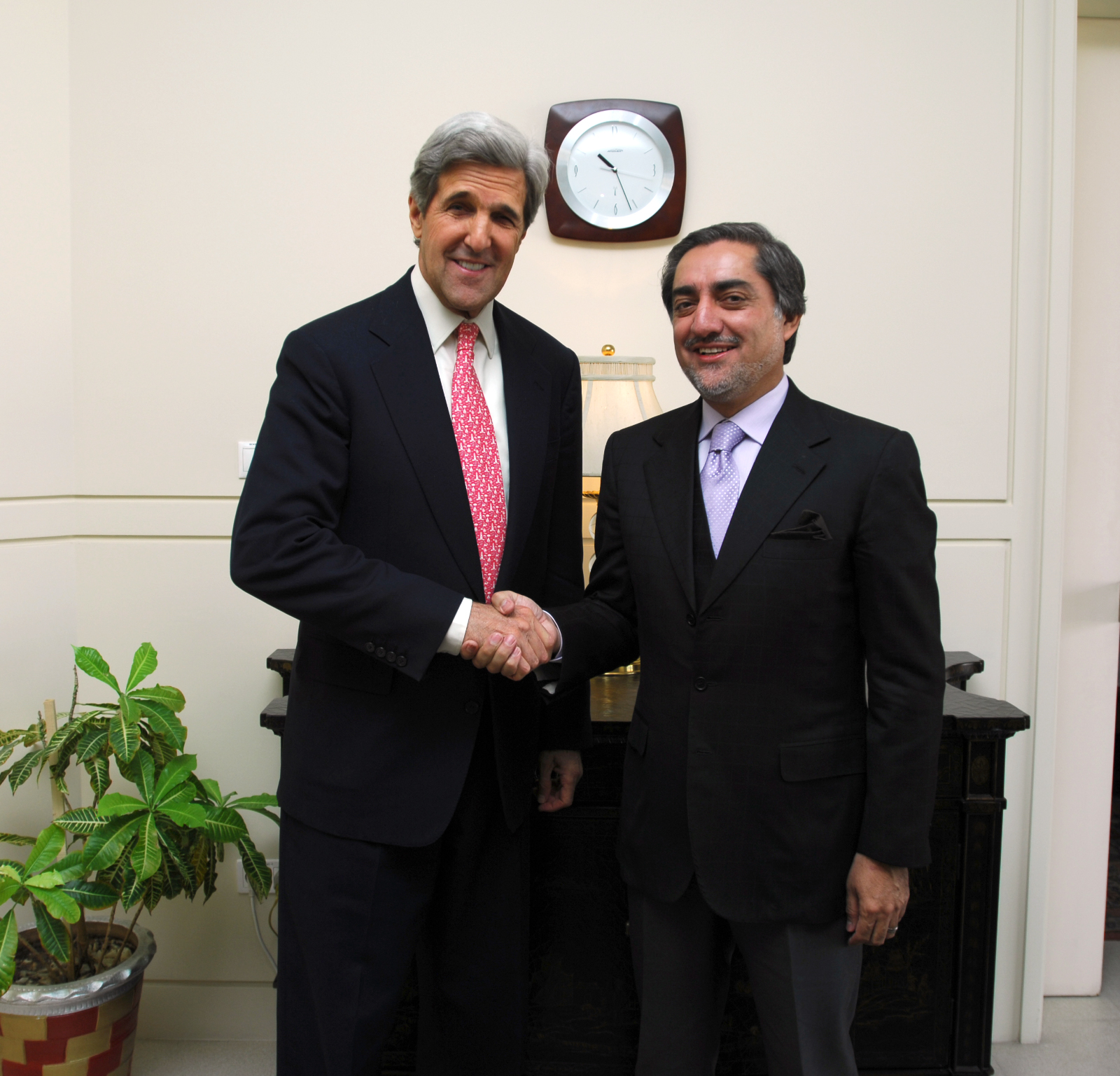
U.S. Senator John Kerry and losing candidate Abdullah Abdullah in October 2009.

Intense Western diplomatic pressure was also being exerted on Abdullah Abdullah to cut a deal. According to The Telegraph, the fear is that if Karzai defies Washington and appoints his own choice of allies to key ministerial roles, he would be more "difficult for the West to influence".

On September 27, 2009, it was reported that the United States and other NATO countries with military forces in Afghanistan had indicated to Hamid Karzai's government that they expected he would remain in office for another five-year term. The U.S. Secretary of State and foreign ministers of the countries, meeting in New York on September 25, 2009, with U.N. Special Representative Kai Eide and Afghan Foreign Minister Rangin Spanta, reached "consensus" in Spanta's presence that Hamid Karzai would probably "continue to be president" of Afghanistan, whether by winning a run-off or as a result of having won more than 50% of the ballots in the disputed August 20 elections. The electoral fraud investigations by the Electoral Complaints Commission had not yet been completed.

On October 15, 2009, Zalmay Khalilzad, the former U.S. ambassador to Afghanistan under George W. Bush, arrived in Kabul from Washington D.C. A spokesperson for the U.S. Embassy in Kabul said Khalilzad was there as a "private citizen" and that he was not representing the United States government. Earlier in the year Khalilzad was widely discussed as an American favorite to assume a powerful, unelected "CEO" position that U.S. officials hoped to create inside the Afghan government. A Western official said Khalilzad had come on the invitation of Mr. Karzai, but a spokesman for Karzai's campaign denied that. In an appearance on Afghan television, Khalilzad indicated that he had come to help Afghans during a difficult election process, but an official in Mr. Abdullah's campaign said they did not want his assistance, saying "We do not need any broker."

On October 17, 2009, the U.N.-backed Electoral Complaints Commission, which had widely been expected to release its findings from the statistics-based audit, delayed the announcement again as U.S. and ally envoys pressured Karzai and Abdullah to state their acceptance of the findings before the ECC announcement and to work out a power-sharing deal. A senior American official made the point of stating that Karzai and Abdullah together won more than 70% of the votes in the first round, ensuring the credibility of a government in which they shared power. A Karzai spokesman indicated that both foreign and Afghan officials were proffering formulas for power sharing, but that Karzai had rejected them and would not discuss power sharing until after a winner is declared. Abdullah also reiterated that he would consider negotiating after the results were announced.

On October 18, 2009, The Telegraph reported that the ECC results were being "delayed as the West asked the men to reach an agreement that would avoid another round of voting." In veiled criticism of Hamid Karzai, White House Chief of Staff Rahm Emanuel made clear that the U.S. would not send more troops to Afghanistan until there is a 'true partner' to work with in Kabul. An expert familiar with the U.S. administration's thinking suggested there was no longer any stomach for an election run-off after the "organisational headaches and risks to American troops" brought by the August 20 ballot, and stated: "There is a clear preference for a deal."

French foreign minister Bernard Kouchner stated that Karzai and Abdullah were ready to "work together" to find a settlement. A Western diplomat in Kabul said: "The idea now is to reach an agreement in which Karzai's victory at the first round is accepted ..."

Following the flurry of last-minute phone calls, visits, and statements that U.S. and other Western officials made to Karzai, on October 19, 2009, The New York Times reported an unnamed Western official saying: "In the last 72 hours, I think even Karzai got the message.".

Demonstrations supporting Karzai took place in Kandahar, in the south of Afghanistan and in Ghazni province in the center of the country. In the district of Spin Boldak, around 3,000 demonstrators gathered in a market, shouting: "We don't want foreigners to interfere in our election."

Ali Shah Khan, a tribal leader from the area, said the protesters believed that foreigners were deliberately delaying the election results, and stated: "The foreign countries want a weak leader for Afghanistan. After that they can do whatever they want."

On October 19, 2009, the ECC communicated its fraud investigation result to the IEC, with its unofficially released findings stripping approximately a million votes from Karzai – and bringing his vote share slightly below the critical 50% threshold required to win without a run-off. The continued concerns that Karzai and the IEC, whose members he appointed, might reject the ECC's findings, resulted in continuation of the intense American and ally efforts to pressure Karzai into accepting a power-sharing deal or face a run-off vote.

According to the U.S. Embassy in Kabul, Senator John Kerry made an unplanned stop in Kabul to meet Karzai in the presidential palace "to continue his discussions and consultations". Meanwhile, according to White House spokesperson Robert Gibbs, the U.S. ambassador to Afghanistan, former U.S. army general Karl Eikenberry who commanded U.S. and ally forces in Afghanistan in 2005–2007, was also engaged in "delicate but extremely important" efforts to persuade Karzai to accept the U.N. panel's ruling.

U.S. Secretary of State Hillary Clinton, stating that she had spoken with Karzai a number of times in recent days, announced that Karzai would be making an announcement the next day, saying "He is going to announce his intentions ... I am very hopeful that we will see a resolution in line with the constitutional order in the next several days. But I don't want to pre-empt in any way President Karzai's statement, which will set the stage for how we go forward in the next stage of this." A diplomatic source told The Times that Karzai would make a nationwide address flanked by U.S. Senator John Kerry and U.N. Special Representative to Afghanistan Kai Eide, claiming that Karzai was prepared to make concessions, such as agreeing to a run-off or forming a power-sharing coalition.

On the other hand, The Times reported that one of Karzai's senior cabinet ministers, Ismail Khan, who had met with Karzai, said he had been told that a formal challenge will be issued: "He said he will complain against the ECC decision, and demand an investigation into why they cut his votes."

According to one analysis on October 20, 2009, "Why a weakened President remains the least worst option" by Tom Coghlan in The Times, the U.S. did not want a run-off to take place, but, rather, was trying to push Karzai into entering a power-sharing deal with his rival, in order to keep him in office but with a "weakened mandate".

On October 20, 2009, after Karzai caved in to intense U.S. and ally pressure that a senior U.S. administration official described as a "full court press", and acceded to a run-off, diplomats said the efforts to get the two men to join forces would now intensify.

On October 21, 2009, U.S. officials, including a U.S. defence official, emphasized that a power-sharing agreement remained a strong possibility as a way of resolving the crisis without going through with the run-off that had just been announced the day before.

On October 25, 2009, Karzai and Abdullah, responding to questions in separate interviews on U.S. television, both rejected a power-sharing deal before the run-off vote. Karzai, responding to questions in a CNN interview, stated that such a deal would be "an insult to democracy". Abdullah, responding to questions on Fox News, ruled out a deal ahead of the run-off, and, in another interview on CNN, stated he had "absolutely no interest" in joining the government if Karzai won, saying that he would not be "part of the same deteriorating situation". The New York Times wrote that such a coalition would provide the U.S. and NATO with political cover for the continued presence of their military forces "because they would be backing a government that had the support of a vast majority of Afghans."

=== Accusations of foreign interference from within the ECC ===
On October 12, 2009, one of the two Afghan members of the Western-dominated Electoral Complaints Commission resigned over "foreign interference".

Maulavi Mustafa Barakzai, a judge who ad been appointed to the panel by the Afghan Supreme Court, stated that his resignation was due to the fact that the three UN-appointed Western officials on the panel – an American, a Canadian, and a Dutch – were "making all the decisions on their own" and that Afghans had little input in its decisions.

Barakzai's resignation left the Electoral Complaints Commission (ECC) with only one Afghan member and three officials from countries with foreign military troops in Afghanistan. The ECC is led by one of the three foreign officials, chairman Grant Kippen.

Karzai said that the resignation Barakzai "cast serious doubt" on the work of the commission.

Mustafa Barakzai, a Supreme Court Judge who was one of two Afghans on the commission, resigned on Monday claiming foreigners were "interfering" in its work. Supporters of Abdullah claimed that Karzai was somehow behind Barakzai's sudden resignation.

== Accusations of a United Nations cover-up ==
U.S. diplomat Peter Galbraith, fired from his UN post by UN Secretary-General Ban Ki-moon on September 30, 2009, after accusing his former boss, UN special envoy Kai Eide, of helping cover up electoral fraud and being biased in favor of Hamid Karzai, further accused the UN of fabricating the reason for his dismissal and of helping to cover up massive electoral fraud committed by Afghan President Hamid Karzai.

In his statements on October 4, 2009, the American diplomat characterized the Afghan election as a "train wreck", and claimed: "As many as 30% of Karzai's votes were fraudulent, and lesser fraud was committed on behalf of other candidates."

Galbraith told The Washington Post that UN Secretary-General Ban Ki-moon's final instruction before firing him was: "Do not talk".

On October 11, 2009, Kai Eide referred to Galbraith's allegations as "personal attacks" against his integrity, adding they have "affected the whole election process."

== See also ==
- Elections in Afghanistan
- 2004 Afghan presidential election
- 2005 Afghan parliamentary election
- War in Afghanistan (1978–present)
- Demography of Afghanistan
- Northern Alliance
- Taliban
- War in Afghanistan (2001–present)
- Civilian casualties of the War in Afghanistan (2001–present)
- Afghan Transitional Administration
- List of Afghan Transitional Administration personnel
- 2009 Iranian presidential election
- International public opinion on the war in Afghanistan
- Bakhtar guest house
