= Pajhwok Afghan News =

News agency in Afghanistan

Pajhwok Afghan News Pashto: پژواک خبري اژانس Dari: آژانس خبرى پژواک
- Type: Independent news agency
- Founded: 2003 by Danish Karokhel
- Motto: Reflecting the Truth
- Headquarters: Kabul, Afghanistan
- Area: Afghanistan
- Owner: Danish Karokhel
- Key people: Danish Karokhel
- Launch date: March 2004
- Official website: pajhwok.com
- Language: English, Dari, Pashto

Pajhwok Afghan News (Pashto: پژواک خبري اژانس) (Dari: آژانس خبرى پژواک) is Afghanistan's largest independent news agency with its headquarters in Kabul. In addition to 24-hour general news reporting, it also publishes special investigative reports about important topics relating to Afghanistan, including political corruption. The agency has eight regional bureaus and a nationwide network of reporters and correspondents. Pajhwok delivers an average daily output of three dozen stories in English, Pashto and Dari languages. The news agency also provides photographs, video footage and audio clips to international wire agencies, televisions and radio stations.

Owned and operated entirely by Afghans, Pajhwok Afghan News claims to have no political affiliations. Its founder and director is Danish Karokhel. Pajhwok is a Pashto word meaning reflection or echo in both Pashto and Dari.

== Pajhwok staff and awards ==
Pajhwok Afghan News (PAN) has received many national and international press awards in the last two decades. These include:

- PAN's director Danish Karokhel won the 2008 CPJ International Press Freedom Award.
- PAN's reporter Weeda Baraki won the best feature-writing award in 2013.
- PAN's journalist Fayyaz Umari won the best photojournalist award in 2016.
- PAN's reporters Bashir Ahmad Naadim, Zirak Fahim and Bismillah Pashtunmal won Voice of America media awards in 2018.
- PAN's reporter Navid Ahmad Barakzai won "journalist of the year award" in 2019.
- PAN won Media & Mission of Anti-Corruption award in March 2021.
- PAN's editor Abasin Zaheer became a recipient of a UNDP award in December 2021.

== See also ==
- Mass media in Afghanistan
