= Timeline of the Canadian Afghan detainee issue =

The following is a timeline of events in the Canadian Afghan detainee issue. This includes many specific dates and statements.

== 2005-2006 ==
- On December 18, 2005, in the midst of a general election and while the Liberal government of Paul Martin was still in power, Chief of Defence Staff Rick Hillier signed an agreement between Canada's Department of National Defence and the Government of Afghanistan which did not include any explicit right of access by Canada to Afghan detainees, or any right of notification or veto if Afghanistan wanted to transfer a detainee on to a third country.
- Following the federal election on January 23, 2006, the arrangement is made public by the new Conservative government in March 2006.
- On April 5, 2006, during the first question period of the 39th Parliament New Democratic Party (NDP) Defence Critic Dawn Black asked Gordon O'Connor to renegotiate the prisoner transfer agreement with the Afghan government. O'Connor refused saying "Mr. Speaker, we have no intention of redrafting the agreement. The Red Cross and the Red Crescent are charged with ensuring that prisoners are not abused. There is nothing in the agreement that prevents Canada from determining the fate of prisoners so there is no need to make any change in the agreement."
- Later in April 2006, Defence Minister Gordon O'Connor explained that "the process is that if Canadian soldiers capture insurgents or terrorists they hand them over to the Afghan authorities and then the International Red Cross or Red Crescent supervise the detainees. If there is any problem, the Red Cross or Red Crescent would inform us and then we would become involved." O'Connor reiterated the same theme on May 31, 2006: "If there is something wrong with their treatment, the Red Cross or Red Crescent would inform us and we would take action." The Red Cross however said that O'Connor was misunderstanding or misinterpreting their mandate, and it was the Canadians' responsibility.
- The Canadian Security Intelligence Service starting playing a role in the interrogation of Afghans captured by Canadian Forces in 2006.

== 2007 ==
- In early February 2007, University of Ottawa (Canada) Law Professor, Amir Attaran produced documents he had received through an Access to Information(Freedom of Information) request showing that three prisoners in the custody of Canadian military police were brought in by their Afghan interrogator for treatment of similar injuries to the head and upper body, all on the same day. Attaran argued this could be evidence of torture on the part of the interrogator and should be investigated. In response, O'Connor stated that "the president of the Red Cross also said that basically our procedures are absolutely spotless, " O'Connor told reporters last month. "He's quite pleased with what we do with prisoners."
- On February 26, the Military Police Complaints Commission announced it would be launching an investigation of the handling of detainees following a complaint filed by Amnesty International Canada and the British Columbia Civil Liberties Association. It was revealed that there were allegations that the three prisoners had in fact been abused by Canadian soldiers.
- On March 8, 2007, the International Committee of the Red Cross stated, in contradiction to O'Connor's earlier words, that it had no role in monitoring the Canada-Afghanistan detainee-transfer agreement. Its spokesman also indicated that following long-established operating procedure, the Red Cross would not reveal to any foreign government any abuses it might find in Afghan prisons. Following the Red Cross statement, O'Connor was heavily criticised by the opposition following this revelation The same day, The Globe and Mail announced that it had discovered the three detainees discussed in the report had subsequently disappeared after being given into ANA custody.
- On March 13, O'Connor traveled to Kandahar to meet with Abdul Noorzai of the Afghan Independent Human Rights Commission. He wanted to "look the man in the eyes", and gain assurances that detainees were being supervised.
- On March 19, O'Connor apologised for previously misleading the House on the Red Cross issue.
- On March 21, in response to continued criticism of O'Connor's earlier actions, Canadian Prime Minister Stephen Harper intervened in the issue, stating in the House that "I can understand the passion that the leader of the Opposition and members of his party feel for the Taliban prisoners... I just wish occasionally they would show the same passion for Canadian soldiers."
- On April 23, 2007, The Globe and Mail published interviews with 30 men who claimed they were "beaten, starved, frozen and choked after they were handed over to Afghanistan's National Directorate of Security". This prompted intense questioning by all opposition parties, including demands for a new agreement with Afghan authorities and unanimous demands for O'Connor's resignation.
- On April 24, a Liberal motion to recall Canadian troops by 2009 failed, as the NDP wished for immediate withdrawal and the Conservatives argued against any timetable for a withdrawal. The same day, in speaking of the detainees, Public Safety Minister Stockwell Day said that "these people have no compunction about machine-gunning, mowing down little children; they have no compunction about decapitating or hanging elderly women; they have no compunction about the most vicious types of torture you can imagine."
- On April 25, The Globe and Mail revealed that it had received an expurgated report by the government on human rights in Afghanistan through a freedom-of-information request, and also had obtained an intact copy through other means. In the official version "negative references to acts such as torture, abuse, and extra judicial killings were blacked out without an explanation." After intensive questioning in the House on this revelation, O'Connor claimed that a new agreement had been reached, saying "we have, in the last few days, entered into a local agreement in the Kandahar province to enter the detention facilities any time we want."
- On April 26, Michael Byers and William Schabas announced they had issued a request to the International Criminal Court to investigate "possible war crimes" by Gordon O'Connor and General Rick Hillier, Chief of the Defence Staff, over the detainee-transfer issue.
- The Globe and Mail quoted an anonymous Conservative source about why Harper was not planning to dismiss O'Connor despite his mistakes with the file: "If it's interpreted as us wavering, or any weakening of resolve that somehow we're on the wrong course, those questions would get asked... The Taliban would see it as a positive thing."
- In Parliament, Stephen Harper stated that there was "no evidence that access is blocked to the prisons" and said that Afghan authorities had agreed to "formalize that agreement so there is no potential misunderstanding", suggesting the agreement had yet to be settled. Shortly afterwards, Stockwell Day asserted that Canadian correctional officers in Kandahar already had unrestricted access to detainees, and this had always been the case. An anonymous Conservative source blamed the apparent difference in messages between Harper and his ministers to Harper's managerial style of "take everything on on your own."
- On April 30, North Atlantic Treaty Organization Secretary General Jaap de Hoop Scheffer announced that the Afghan government was to launch an inquiry about the fate of detainees. In Parliament, House Leader Peter Van Loan questioned the existence of torture, saying "we have yet to see one specific allegation of torture ... If [opposition members] have a specific name, we'd be happy to have it investigated and chased down, but they continue to repeat the baseless accusations made by those who wish to undermine our forces there." Stockwell Day claimed that Corrections Canada officials in Afghanistan had heard abuse claims from detainees.
- On May 2, General Hillier took responsibility for signing the detainee-transfer agreement in December 2005, saying "Truly at the time we thought that was the right thing to do, that it was the right approach. Obviously we'll reassess that as allegations come out that perhaps that was not sufficient." He also indicated that Canadians soldiers in Afghanistan were upset at the prominence the abuse allegations had received in Canadian media. The Federal Court announced a hearing into an injunction filed by Amnesty International against future detainee transfers.
- On May 3, Hiller announced that a new detainee transfer agreement had been signed which allows for follow-up monitoring of prisoners. Following this, the Federal Court hearing was suspended.
- On June 1, 2007, following testimony from officials from the Department of Foreign Affairs and the Office of Information Commissioner, New Democratic Party Ethics Critic Pat Martin sent a letter to the acting commissioner of the Royal Canadian Mounted Police (RCMP) asking for a criminal probe into DFAIT's cover-up of reports regarding extrajudicial killing and torture in Afghan prisons.
- On June 25, 2007, it was revealed that the military probe investigating handling of detainees would not investigate any aspect of the detainee's treatment after their handover to Afghan authorities.
- On August 14, 2007, during a cabinet shuffle, Gordon O'Connor was transferred from National Defence to National Revenue, with Peter MacKay taking over as defence minister. Many media reports, including the CBC, the Globe and Mail, and National Post regarded O'Connor's new portfolio as a demotion as a consequence of his handling of the prisoner abuse allegations.
- On August 31, 2007, it was revealed that General Hillier and the government had hired British legal scholar Christopher Greenwood to submit a legal opinion to the Federal Court of Canada arguing "Canada's military has no obligation to accord Afghan detainees Canadian-style legal rights."

== 2008-2009 ==
- In January 2008, it was revealed that the Harper government, months earlier, quietly ceased the detainee transfers after an internal investigation revealed the allegations to be credible.
- On October 6, 2009, the lawyer for Canadian diplomat, Richard Colvin (called to testify at a hearing into allegations of Afghan prison torture) said that the Conservative government was trying to keep her client silent. In a letter sent to the Canadian Department of Justice and obtained by CBC News, lawyer Lori Bokenfohr said the government invoked the national security order in response to Richard Colvin's decision to co-operate with the Military Police Complaints Commission.
- On November 18, 2009, allegations regarding the treatment of Taliban prisoners captured by Canadian forces in Afghanistan resurfaced in parliamentary testimony by Richard Colvin, the second highest-ranked member of Canada’s diplomatic service in Afghanistan from 2006 to 2007. Liberal MPs demanded an independent public inquiry to get to the bottom of the torture scandal, "in order to restore Canada's human rights record and trust in government". "It's now clear that Canadian diplomat Richard Colvin was muzzled with every effort made to prevent him from documenting his findings or report them publicly – but the story on why this was covered up still has yet to be told", said Liberal Foreign Affairs Critic Bob Rae. Liberal MP Irwin Cotler said Canada "acted responsibly" when the previous Liberal government called an inquiry into the deportation and torture of Maher Arar in a Syrian prison: this Canadian citizen was passing through New York from a vacation in Tunisia seven years ago when U.S. officials held him, wrongly accused him of links with Al Qaeda and sent him to Syria, where he was jailed for months and regularly beaten. "Getting to the bottom of what happened to Mr. Arar was important to Canadians in order to restore their confidence in their government and the administration of justice. It was important to the international community to know that we would not be part of any cover up". Liberal Defence Critic Ujjal Dosanjh stated that the Conservatives' "complicity" undermines Canada's mission to bring democracy and respect for the rule of law to Afghanistan.
- On November 19, 2009, the Canadian government dismissed calls for a public inquiry. "There has not been a single, solitary proven allegation of abuse involving a transferred Taliban prisoner by Canadian forces" MacKay said in the House of Commons. MacKay painted Colvin as having been "duped" by the Taliban and suggested not to accept the word of prisoners "who throw acid in the face of schoolgirls". Also he said he did not know about Colvin's allegations. Ottawa University law professor Amir Attaran said MacKay had to explain how he could not have known about the 17 reports that Colvin wrote 17 reports with more than 70 cc's that he sent to colleagues in Ottawa.
- On December 4, 2009, the Liberals accused the government to "stonewall" the requests for a public inquiry, despite mounting evidence that the Conservative government refused to act on warnings of torture:

1. The International Red Cross warned Canada of torture and complained of notification delays. In May and June 2006, Richard Colvin and at least two other Canadian officials were twice warned by the Red Cross that torture was a serious risk in Afghan prisons. The Red Cross also complained that it took up to two months for Canada to report prisoner transfers to them.

2. The government pressured soldiers to transfer detainees faster. Top Canadian commanders in Kandahar testified to the Military Police Complaints Commission that officials in Ottawa pressured them to transfer detainees before proper medical treatment or paperwork could be administered.

3. Afghan intelligence stopped accepting Canadian detainees due to a lack of evidence. Complaints about the quality of evidence provided by Canadian troops left Afghan prosecutors with little admissible evidence to use in judicial proceedings, and resulted in a halt of detainee transfers at their request.

4. Many Canadian transferred detainees were not high-value Taliban targets. A Canadian commander in Afghanistan told the Military Police Complaints Commission that they were "detaining the local yokels and handing them off".

5. In spring 2007, Richard Colvin told the Prime Minister’s advisor for Afghanistan, David Mulroney, that the Afghan Independent Human Rights Commission charged with monitoring Canadian-transferred detainees had little or no access to the Kandahar prison run by the National Directorate of Security – contrary to assurances provided by then-Defence Minister Gordon O'Connor.

6. Linda Garwood-Filbert, a Corrections Canada official who visited Afghan prisons, did not consider the discovery of a braided electrical cable in the office of the director of Afghan investigations as evidence of torture.

7. The government only provided incomplete and redacted documents to members of the Canadian House of Commons Special Committee on the Canadian Mission in Afghanistan, refusing to provide unredacted copies of Richard Colvin’s reports, detainee memos, and the annual human rights report of the Canadian Embassy in Afghanistan.

8. Canadian officials did not investigate torture allegations. Eight months after the new detainee agreement was put in place, Canadian official Kerry Buck said in a court document, "It is not our role to determine the credibility of the allegations, to determine the veracity of the allegations. We don't investigate those allegations."

9. The International Criminal Court would examine the treatment of Afghan prisoners.

- On December 5, 2009, Defense Minister Peter MacKay said Canada was "trying to change the culture" in Afghanistan. When asked why it took more than a year to act on allegations of torture, MacKay said to the press that the government moved as fast as they could. "We acted almost immediately. In fact, upon taking government it became quite clear there were deficiencies in the arrangement of how we transfer detainees".
- On December 9, 2009, after the release of a letter signed by 23 ex-ambassadors that condemned Conservative attempts to discredit Colvin, the NDP demanded the resignation of Defence Minister Peter MacKay's, accusing him of misleading the House of Commons over what the government knew about the possible torture and what it did about the allegations. That number later climbed to 125 retired ambassadors. On December 9, 2009, after testifying the day prior that one particular abused detainee was never in Canadian Forces custody, General Walter Natynczyk corrected himself upon receiving new information showing the contrary. Canada's top military commander went on to say that he would investigate the incident and why the information about it was so slow to surface.
- On December 10, 2009, the House of Commons of Canada passed a motion requiring the release of unredacted documents concerning the Afghan detainees to the committee hearing the issue. The government refused, setting up the possibility that it could be found in contempt of Parliament.
- On December 16, 2009, excerpts were published from Colvin's Dec. 16 letter to the House of Commons Special Committee on the Canadian Mission in Afghanistan.
- On December 21, 2009, it was unveiled that the former Canadian ministers Peter MacKay (Foreign Affairs), Stockwell Day (Public Safety) and Gordon O'Connor (Defense), met the head of the International Red Cross in the fall of 2006, when the humanitarian organization tried to focus Canada's attention on alleged abuses in Afghan prisons. The exact contents of the reports of Jakob Kellenberger and Robert Greenhill, then president of the Canadian International Development Agency, in a meeting on September 26, 2006, remained secret.
- On December 23, 2009, Colvin accused David Mulroney, his former superior at Foreign Affairs in Ottawa and presently Canada's ambassador to China, of misinforming the parliamentary committee and high-ranking defence officers of negligence in his written rebuttal of officials who testified against his allegations. He tabled his written response at a special House of Commons committee on the detainees affair to clarify "inaccurate or incomplete" evidence by top officials whose testimony has been cited by Defence Minister Peter MacKay to characterize him Colvin as a lone witness whose allegations "lack credibility". Mulroney called Colvin's allegations "speculation," denied that his entreaties about torture had been ignored at top levels in Ottawa and he told parliamentarians that Canadian reports from Afghanistan were edited only to remove opinion or non-fact-based information.
- On December 30, 2009, Parliament was prorogued at the request of Prime Minister Stephen Harper. According to his spokesman, he sought this prorogation (his second prorogation) to consult with Canadians about the economy. "The move triggered immediate condemnation from opposition [Members of Parliament] who labelled the Conservative government's move an "almost despotic" attempt to muzzle parliamentarians amid controversy over the Afghan detainees affair." (See 2010 Canada anti-prorogation protests)

== 2010 ==
- On January 11 Ignatieff again stated that the prorogation was to avoid responding to the Afghan detainee issue, and other issues.
- Witness Richard Colvin files complaint against Harper government (See Wikinews tag > )
- Early February - In spite of the prorogation, the parliamentary committee looking into the Afghan detainee issue resumed its hearing informally. The hearing was considered informal because the committees do not have power to compel testimony or grant immunity and Conservative MPs would not be represented.
- February 3, 2010 - New Democratic Party foreign affairs critic Paul Dewar sent a letter to Rob Nicholson, the justice minister, demanding the documents be released. "If he says 'No' obviously we have contempt of Parliament. And I want it in writing," said Dewar.
- On Feb 4, 2010, top constitutional scholar Errol Mendes and military legal expert Michel Drapeau, urged MPs not to abandon their probe into the Canadian Afghan detainee issue. Mendes referred to the Harper government's refusal to hand over uncensored documents, despite a motion passed in the House of Commons to do so: He stated, "The executive is really placing itself above Parliament. For the first time that I know in Canadian history, the executive is saying we are superior to Parliament....This is nothing more than an open defiance of Parliament. Nothing more, nothing less," he said. He said the Conservative government has violated the Constitution of Canada and will be in contempt of Parliament if it continues to refuse to release uncensored documents regarding the Afghan detainee issue.
- On February 4, 2010, the Toronto Star reported that Bob Rae will not rule out a formal censure of the government for blocking a parliamentary investigation of detainee abuse in Afghanistan when MPs return to work in March, 2010.
- On March 2, 2010, MP Derek Lee began setting the stage for a constitutional showdown: He announced that, as soon as he can, he will introduce a privilege motion that calls for an official reprimand of Defence Minister Peter MacKay and a reproach of a Department of Justice official. If his motion is successful it could see the Commons sergeant-at-arms using a never-before-exercised power to seize the documents which Parliament requested in December, 2009. He also wrote to the Governor General warning that she may need to wade into the fray if the government decides to keep flouting the December 2009 Parliamentary order to produce documents related to the treatment of Afghan detainees.
- On March 5, 2010, Justice Minister Rob Nicholson announced to the House of Commons that former Supreme Court of Canada judge Frank Iacobucci was appointed to determine if any "injurious" effects would result from making the Afghan detainee documents public. The opposition expressed deep disappointment with the decision, saying that they did not doubt the competence of the former justice, but believed that it was nothing more than another way to delay the issue. In an interview with Evan Solomon, Liberal and NDP defence critics Ujjal Dosanjh and Jack Harris, respectively, repeated that Parliament has the constitutional right to review unredacted documents, and that there are systems in place to decide what is and is not appropriate to release to the public.
- Also on March 5, a second, more serious issue arose when the CBC News published the following statement "Until now, the controversy has centred on whether the government turned a blind eye to abuse of Afghan detainees. However, [ University of Ottawa law professor Amir Attaran ] said the full versions of the documents show that Canada went even further in intentionally handing over prisoners to torturers." "If the allegation is true, such actions would constitute a war crime, said Attaran, who has been digging deep into the issue and told CBC News he has seen uncensored versions of government documents released last year."
- On March 18, the three opposition parties united in a bid to force the Conservative Party of Canada to let them look at uncensored documents on the Afghan detainees affair or face parliamentary contempt proceedings. Speaker of the House of Commons of Canada Peter Milliken said he would rule on the potential breach of privilege after giving ministers a chance to respond. Toronto Liberal Derek Lee, an expert on parliamentary rights, said the request from Parliament was based on "340 years of bedrock constitutional history" in which Parliament has the right to keep the government accountable and to summon documents and witnesses to perform its functions. "There are no other persons who can come into this House to protect the constitutional foundations of this country, only the 308 persons here," Lee said, referring to MPs. "So if we do not stand up for our Parliament's role on behalf of Canadians, then there is no one else out there to do it."
- On April 12, 2010, the Speaker thanked all for their submissions and said he would now be considering the matter with a judgment to be delivered "in due course." Those comments in Parliament had come first from Peter MacKay and Rob Nicholson (representing the government), then from Derek Lee and Jack Harris (representing the opposition), then from Tom Lukiwski and Jim Abbott (again representing the government).
- On April 27, 2010, Milliken ruled that Parliament had a right to ask for uncensored documents. He asked that all House leaders, ministers and MPs to come to a collective solution by May 11, 2010 "without compromising the security and confidentiality contained.".
- It was not until June 16, 2010 that a Memorandum of Understanding was actually tabled in the House of Commons. This was after ten all-party meetings (50 days) since the Speaker's April 27, 2010 ruling, and was 36 days after the Speaker's deadline. Even then, it was still not agreed to by all political parties: the NDP refused to endorse the deal. There was also disagreement over whether the Speaker of the House had made unanimity a requirement in order for the deal to exist. On June 14, 2010, NDP MP Joe Comartin said, "The Speaker of the House of Commons was very clear that all the parties must arrive at a compromise ...It has to be unanimous."

== See also ==
- 2010 Canada anti-prorogation protests
- Bagram torture and prisoner abuse
- Canada's role in the invasion of Afghanistan
- Canadian Afghan detainee issue
- Canadian Forces casualties in Afghanistan
- Criticism of the war on terrorism
- International public opinion on the war in Afghanistan
- Opposition to the War in Afghanistan (2001–present)
- Prorogation in Canada
- Protests against the invasion of Afghanistan
- Richard Colvin (diplomat)
- War in Afghanistan (2001–2021)
