= Richard Colvin =

Richard Colvin may refer to:

- Richard Colvin (foreign service officer) (born 1969), Canadian diplomat
- Richard Colvin (British Army officer) (1856–1936), British officer and politician
