= Richard Colvin (foreign service officer) =

Canadian foreign service officer

Richard Colvin is a Canadian foreign service officer who gained public attention as a witness in the Canadian Afghan detainee issue. He appeared before the Special Committee on the Canadian Mission in Afghanistan in late 2009, where he testified that Afghan detainees turned over to Afghanistan prisons by Canadian soldiers were tortured. His testimony led to intense scrutiny of the Harper government's detainee policies in Kandahar, including through further witnesses at the House of Commons Afghanistan committee. On January 1, 2010, Prime Minister Harper prorogued Parliament, preventing further testimony on the Afghan detainee issue. This then triggered anti-prorogation protests.

== Early life ==
Colvin was born in 1969 in a village near Coventry, Great Britain, where he lived until the age of 16, when his family migrated to Canada, settling near Waterdown, Ontario. He studied international relations and Russian language at the University of Toronto, and in 1992 joined the Canadian foreign service after passing his second attempt at the foreign service exam. In 2002, he was posted to Ramallah in the Palestinian territories, where he served on a new political mission established in the wake of Yasser Arafat's death. He was posted back to Calgary in 2005 where he served before being posted to Afghanistan.

== As a witness in the Afghan detainee issue ==
On October 6, 2009, the lawyer for Colvin (called to testify at a hearing into allegations of Afghan prison torture) said that the Conservative government was trying to keep her client silent. In a letter sent to the Canadian Department of Justice and obtained by CBC News, lawyer Lori Bokenfohr said the government invoked the national security order in response to Colvin's decision to co-operate with the Military Police Complaints Commission.

=== Claims ===
During his testimony to a Parliamentary committee in November 2009, Colvin said Canada did not monitor detainee conditions in Afghanistan and that detainees transferred by Canadians to Afghan prisons were likely tortured. "According to our information, the likelihood is that all the Afghans we handed over were tortured", Colvin said. "For interrogators in Kandahar, it was a standard operating procedure". Colvin worked in Kandahar in 2006 before moving to Kabul. He said his reports were ignored and he was eventually told to stop putting the reports in writing.

=== Reception ===
Colvin’s testimony at the Parliamentary committee was controversial. A 2015 review by the Canadian Centre for Policy Alternatives and Rideau Institute supports Colvin's conclusions and notes the efforts made by elected officials and civil servants to suppress his criticism. Another study concludes that Colvin's evidence was supported by other observers and that his disclosures had been politicized by the government of the day in an effort to minimize public relations damage, including ordering his silence and attacking him personally in Parliament. He alleged a number of reprisals as a result of his disclosures; the outcome of his complaints was not covered in the media, but he retained his position.

== See also ==
- 2010 Canada anti-prorogation protests
- Bagram torture and prisoner abuse
- Canadian Afghan detainee issue
- Canada's role in the invasion of Afghanistan
- Canadian Forces casualties in Afghanistan
- Criticism of the war on terrorism
- International public opinion on the war in Afghanistan
- Opposition to the War in Afghanistan (2001–present)
- Protests against the invasion of Afghanistan
- Timeline of the Canadian Afghan detainee issue
- War in Afghanistan (2001–present)
