= 2010 Canada anti-prorogation protests =

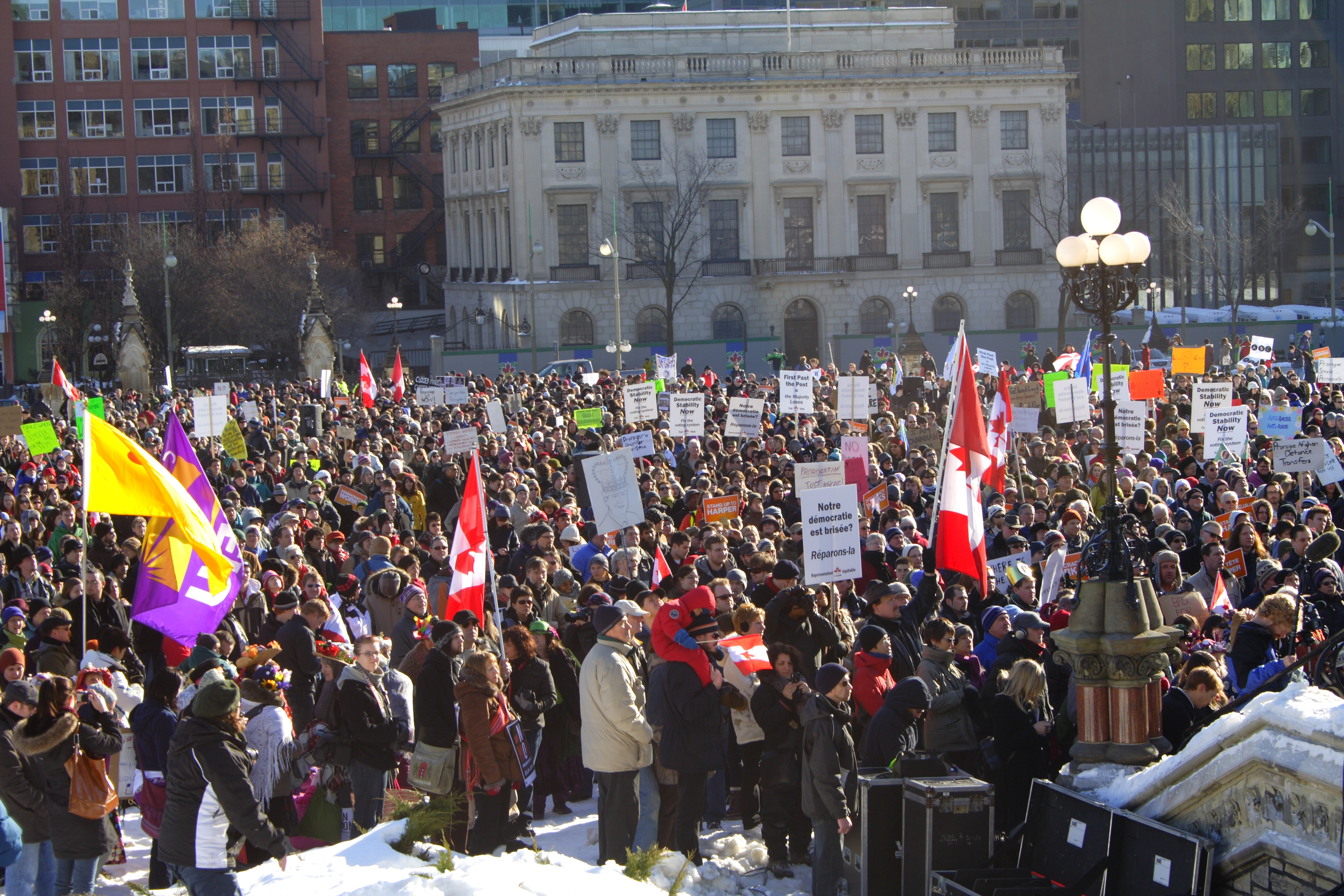
Demonstrators on Parliament Hill in Ottawa.

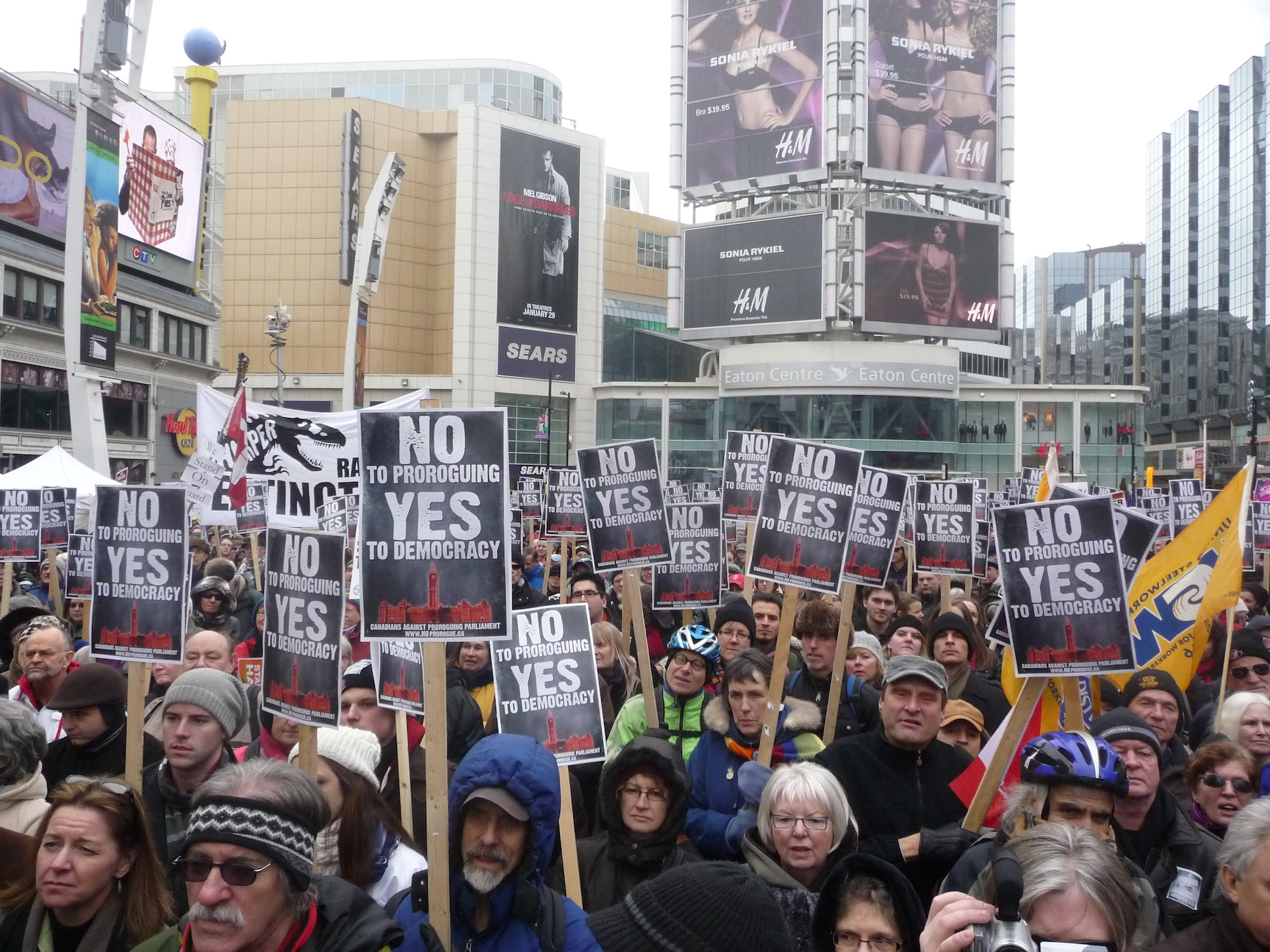
Protesters holding picket signs in Toronto.

On 23 January 2010 there were numerous protests opposing the prorogation of the 40th Canadian Parliament. The prorogation had occurred a month earlier on 30 December 2009 on the constitutional advice of Prime Minister of Canada Stephen Harper and was officially carried out by Governor General Michaëlle Jean. Protests were held in over 60 cities and towns in Canada, and internationally in New York City, San Francisco, Dallas, London, Oman, Brussels, Amsterdam, The Hague and Costa Rica. The protests and rallies attracted approximately 21,000 participants, including many who had joined a group on Facebook, known as the "Canadians Against Proroguing Parliament" (CAPP). At the 23 January rallies in Ottawa and Toronto, Liberal Party leader Michael Ignatieff, New Democratic Party (NDP) leader Jack Layton, Green Party leader Elizabeth May, and Member of Parliament Bob Rae spoke against the prorogation, while at the rally in Montreal, Bloc Québécois leader Gilles Duceppe spoke alongside future NDP leader, Thomas Mulcair, and Liberal MP Marc Garneau. Future Liberal Leader and Prime Minister Justin Trudeau was also in attendance at the Montreal Rally.

== Background ==
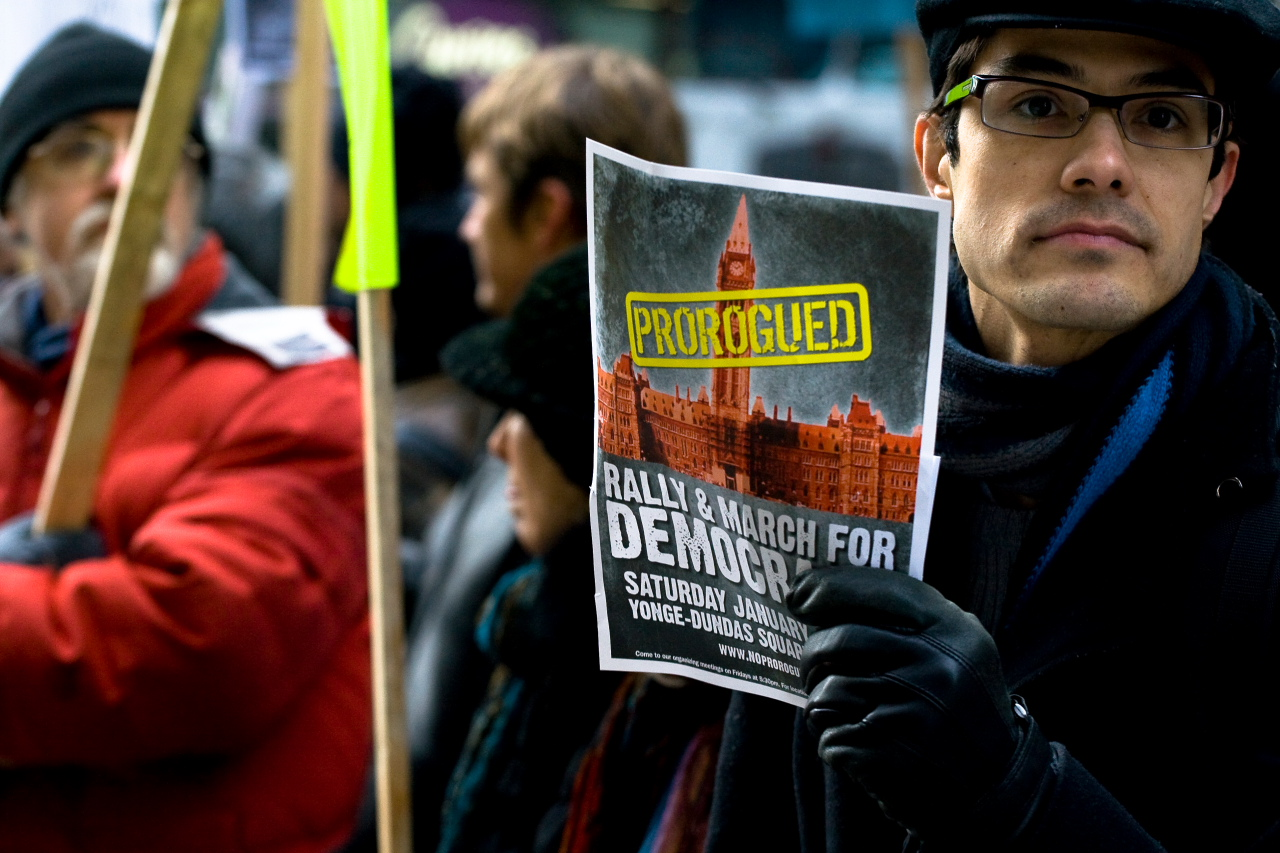
A group of protesters arrived outside the C.D. Howe Institute in downtown Toronto on 20 January to voice their discontent with Stephen Harper and his prorogation of parliament.

The first session of the 40th Canadian Parliament opened on 18 November 2008, after the Conservative Party, led by Prime Minister Stephen Harper, won a strengthened minority in that year's election, increasing their seat count by 16. The leaders of the parties in opposition—the Liberal Party, NDP, and the Bloc Québécois—soon initiated talk of voting non-confidence in the government and offering themselves as a coalition government to Governor General Michaëlle Jean. However, Stephen Harper delayed the confidence vote scheduled for 1 December and advised the Governor General to prorogue parliament from 4 December 2008, to 26 January 2009. The opposition coalition dissolved shortly after, with the Conservatives winning a Liberal supported confidence vote on 29 January 2009.

On 30 December 2009, Prime Minister Harper announced that he had counselled the Governor General to prorogue parliament throughout the 12–28 February 2010 Winter Olympics, until 3 March 2010, and Jean signed the proclamation later that day, granting his request, as provided for by constitutional convention. The prorogation eliminated 22 sitting days from the Parliamentary schedule. According to Harper's spokesman, the Prime Minister sought this prorogation to consult with Canadians about the economy. However, the move triggered immediate condemnation from Liberal House Leader Ralph Goodale, who labelled the Conservative government's move an "almost despotic" attempt to muzzle parliamentarians amid controversy over the Afghan detainees affair. In an interview with CBC News, Prince Edward Island Liberal Member of Parliament Wayne Easter accused the Prime Minister of "shutting democracy down". During this time, PMO spokesman Dimitri Soudas pointed out to the media that the Prime Minister was at work in Ottawa while the Liberal leader Michael Ignatieff was off at his vacation home in the south of France.

== Events prior to the January protests ==
On 5 January 132 political scientists signed a letter condemning the prorogation and called for electoral reform. This letter was the work of Fair Vote Canada, a non-partisan organization. Among the 132 political scientists signing the statement were 10 professors emeriti, including Meyer Brownstone, Peter H. Russell, and John S. Saul; the President-elect of the Canadian Political Science Association (CPSA); six former presidents of CPSA, including John Meisel and Alan Cairns; the current Secretary General of the International Political Science Association (IPSA); and a former Secretary General of IPSA.

On 5 January, in an interview on CBC TV The National, Mr Harper said that prorogation was a "routine" move to allow the government to adjust its budget due on 4 March. His spokesman stated that the 63-day gap between sessions was less than the average prorogation of 151 days since 1867. However, in the three decades prior to his 2009 prorogation the average was just 22 days.

On 7 January, the British weekly news publication The Economist published two articles on the issue, both generally critical of the prorogation. One article stated that "Mr Harper's move looks like naked self-interest." The other article stated that Harper has, "given the opposition, which is divided and fumbling, an opportunity."

Opposition leaders stated that Harper's real reason for the prorogation was to end an embarrassing debate on the government's alleged complicity in the torture of Afghan detainees, and in particular to avoid complying with a parliamentary motion to hand over all documents relevant to those charges. They also stated that the prime minister wanted to name new senators and then reconstitute the Senate's committees to reflect the Conservatives' additional representation, something that could not be done if Parliament was merely adjourned. Ned Franks, a historian and veteran political scientist said that no previous prime minister has prorogued the legislature "in order to avoid the kind of things that Harper apparently wants to avoid,"

The initial organization of the 23 January rallies started with a group on the social networking website Facebook, called "Canadians Against Proroguing Parliament" in early January 2010, led by Christopher White, an anthropology student at the University of Alberta. The actual coordination of the rallies was organized by a secondary Facebook group, called "Canadians Against Proroguing Parliament-Rally for the Cause!", which was founded by Shilo Davis, who acted as the National Rally Coordinator in collaboration with Chris White and his group. By 9 January, eleven days after the prorogation, it had gained 113,000 members. The group gained public support from Michael Ignatieff.

An Ekos poll released 7 January found that Canadians were nearly twice as likely to oppose the 30 December 2010 prorogation than support it.

A poll, done by Angus Reid prior to 9 January, found that 38 per cent of Canadians believed that Harper used the prorogation to curtail the Afghan detainee inquiry. On 11 January Ignatieff again stated that the prorogation was to avoid responding to the Afghan detainee issue, and the issue of climate change in relation to the Copenhagen Conference in December.

Prior to 20 January, comedian Rick Mercer ranted on the Rick Mercer Report, "...Now polls never tell the full story but this much is certain: whenever the party in power drops 15 points in 15 days, you can be assured of one thing – someone in charge just did something really stupid." By 21 January, the Liberal Party and the Conservative party were in a virtual tie.

By the time of the 23 January rallies, the Facebook group had over 210,000 members.

== January protests ==
On 20 January 2010, a rally of approximately 60 protesters gathered to greet Prime Minister Harper as he visited the C.D. Howe Institute in Toronto. On that same day NDP leader Jack Layton called for limits to prorogation saying that his party will call for legislative changes that would require a majority vote of MPs for the prorogation of Parliament.

Three days later the main planned rallies gathered across Canada. The rally in Toronto at Yonge-Dundas Square (now Sankofa Square) was the largest in Canada, attracting over 6,000 demonstrators, while the one in Ottawa involved close to 3,000. The largest per capita turnout was found in Victoria, where 1,500 people rallied under sunny skies. Protesters in many ridings with Conservative Members of Parliament urged the Party's members back to work. In Regina, three supporters of Harper counter-protested, and were booed by the main crowd. Protesters determined that Stephen Harper was using voter apathy to his advantage while proroguing parliament. At the Ottawa rally, Michael Ignatieff said that "This is a demonstration that shows that Canadians understand their democracy, care for their democracy, and if necessary will fight for their democracy. This demonstration does not belong to the politicians of any party, it belongs to the Canadian people", while announcing that the Liberal MPs would be back to work on 25 January, the original date for the end of prorogation, to hold public meetings. New Democratic Party leader Jack Layton also called for limits to prorogation. During the Toronto rally, Bob Rae commented that he attended "because it's a chance for me to join others who agree that Mr. Harper made a terrible decision." Rae has subsequently been criticized for his controversial use of the power to prorogue when he was Premier of Ontario.

Anti-Prorogation Protests January 23, 2010
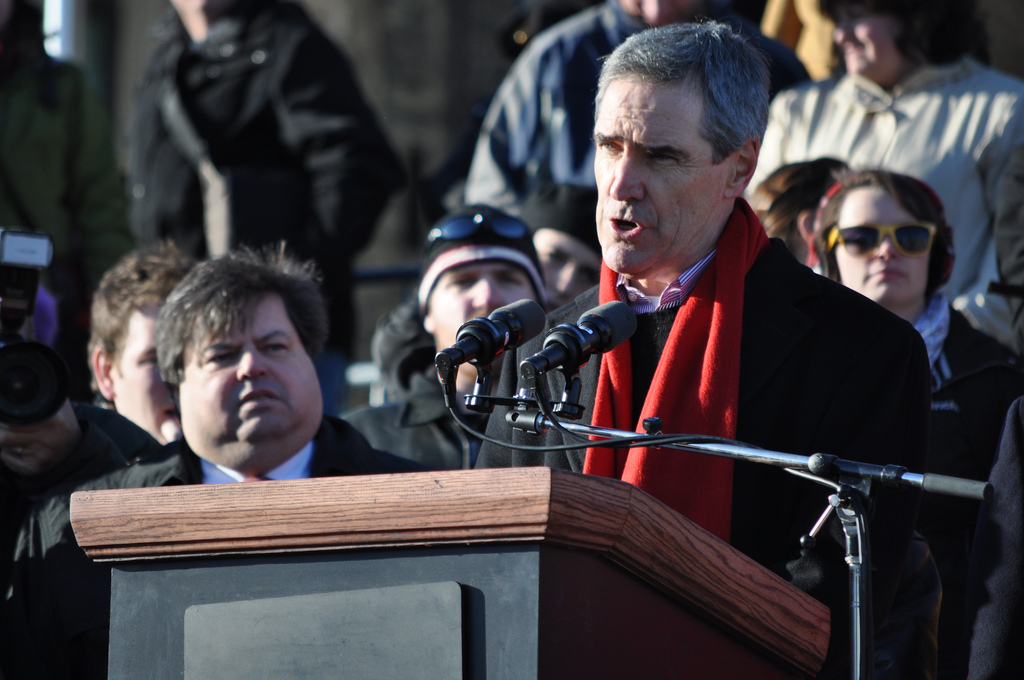
Liberal Leader, Michael Ignatieff speaking at the protest

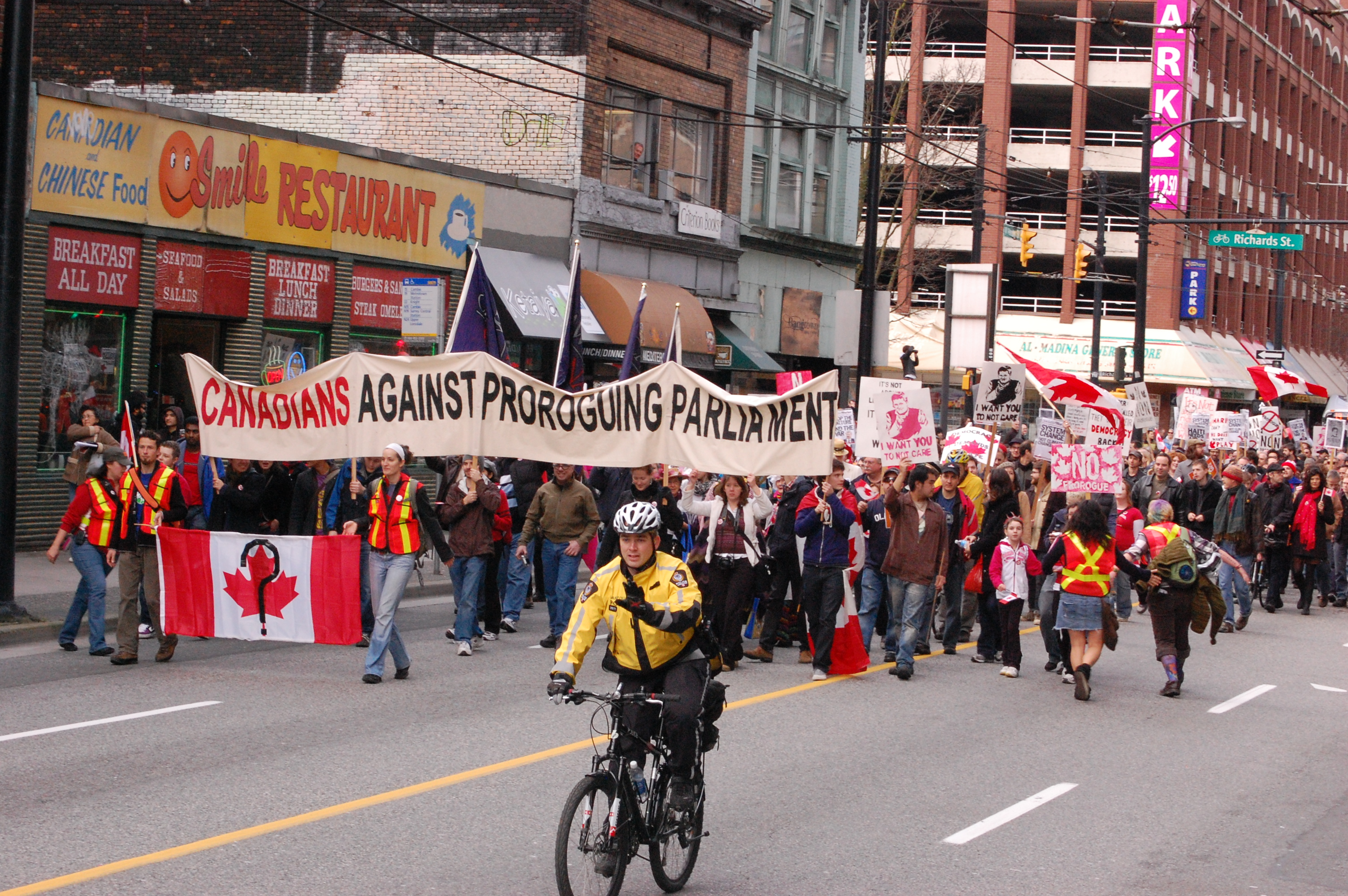
Canadians Against Proroguing Parliament in Vancouver.

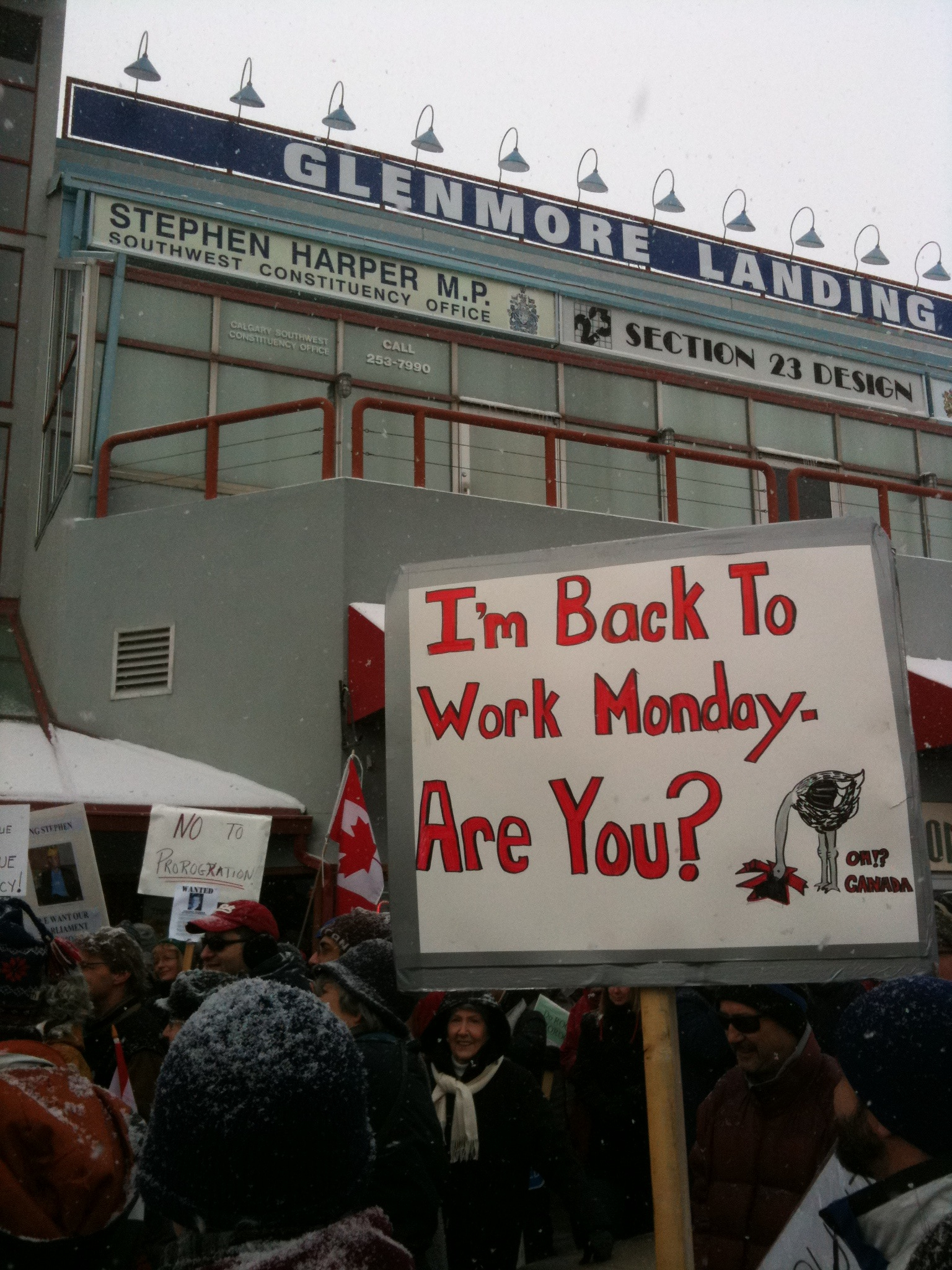
Anti-prorogation protesters in Calgary.

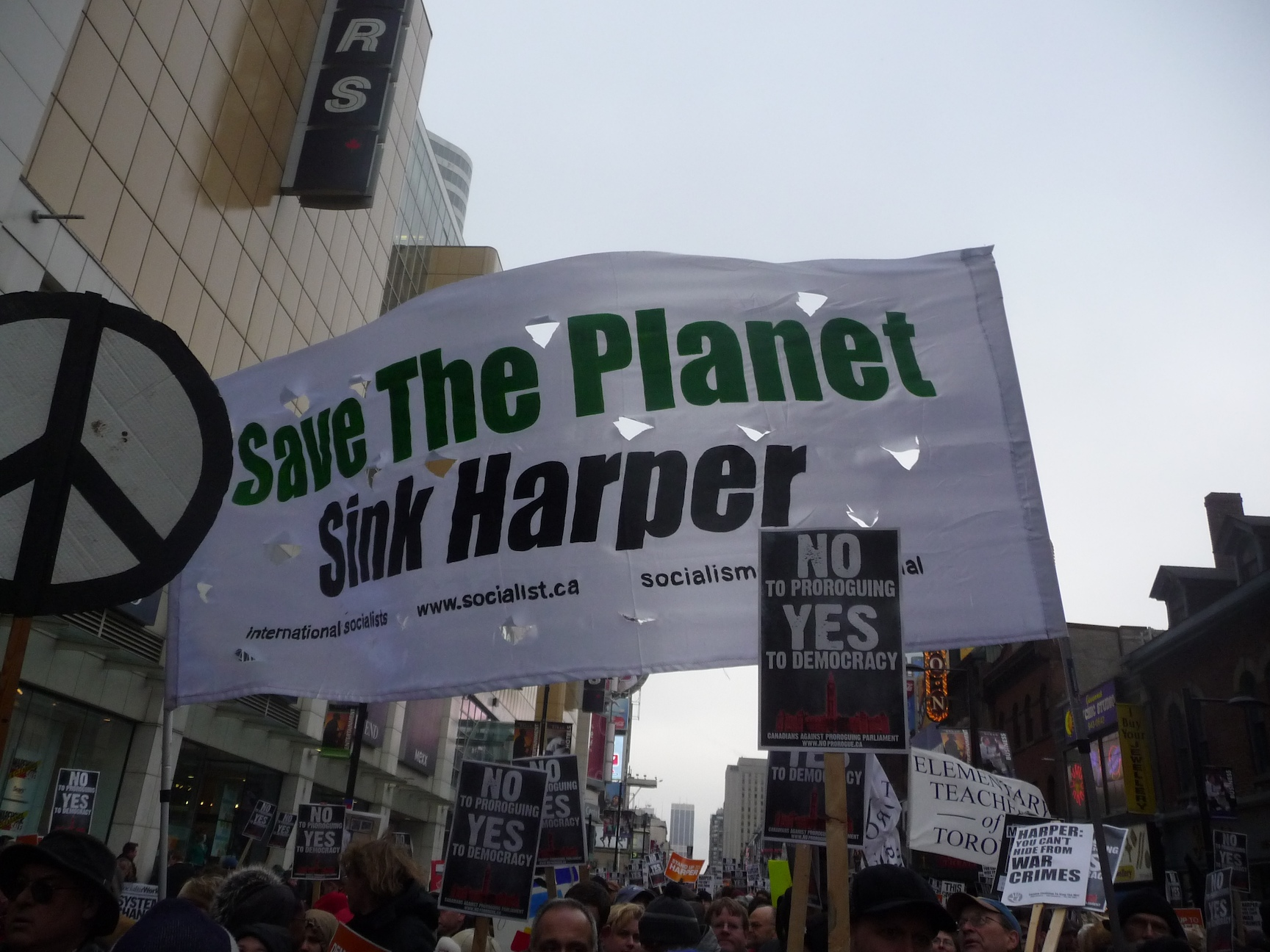
Socialist and environmentalist groups in Toronto.

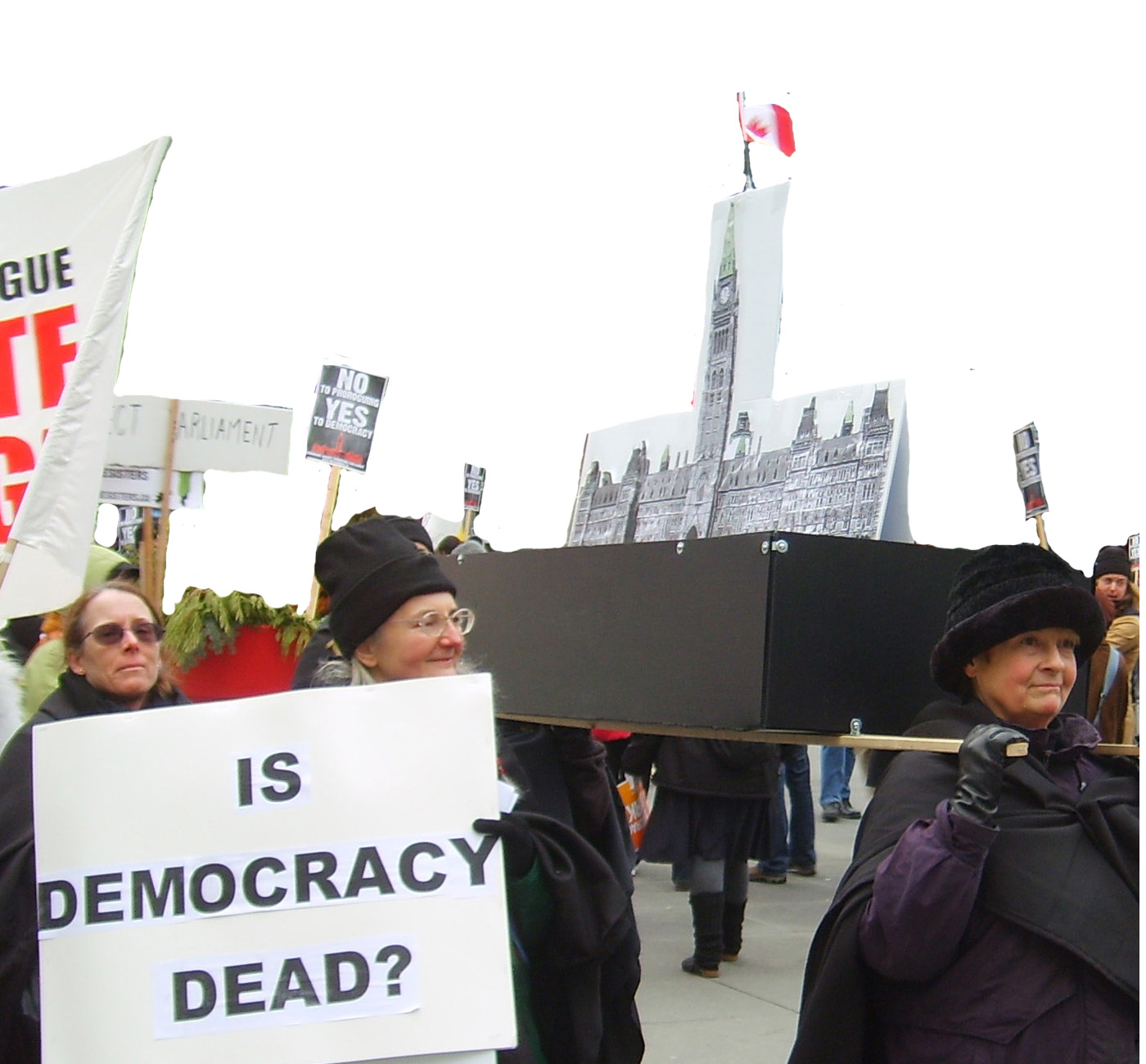
Toronto protest drama

Toronto protest in Yonge-Dundas Square showing a related sign about Canada and Iraq War resisters

Toronto crowds of protesters in Yonge-Dundas Square

== Aftermath to the January protests ==
=== Prorogation informally challenged by the continuation of Parliamentary hearing on Afghan detainee issue ===
In spite of the prorogation, the parliamentary committee looking into the Afghan detainee issue resumed its hearing informally in early February. The hearing is considered informal because the committees do not have power to compel testimony or grant immunity and Conservative MPs would not be represented.

On 4 Feb 2010, top constitutional scholar Errol Mendes and military legal expert Michel Drapeau, urged MPs not to abandon their probe into the Canadian Afghan detainee issue. Mendes referred to the Harper government's refusal to hand over uncensored documents, despite a motion passed in the House of Commons to do so: He stated, "The executive is really placing itself above Parliament. For the first time that I know in Canadian history, the executive is saying we are superior to Parliament....This is nothing more than an open defiance of Parliament. Nothing more, nothing less," he said. He said the Conservative government has violated the Constitution of Canada and will be in contempt of Parliament if it continues to refuse to release uncensored documents regarding the Afghan detainee issue.

New Democratic Party foreign affairs critic Paul Dewar sent a letter 3 February 2010 to Rob Nicholson, the justice minister, demanding the documents be released. "If he says 'No' obviously we have contempt of Parliament. And I want it in writing," said Dewar.

On 4 February 2010, the Toronto Star reported that Bob Rae will not rule out a formal censure of the government for blocking a parliamentary investigation of detainee abuse in Afghanistan when MPs return to work in March 2010. Rae said, "I'm not reluctant to go any route."

=== Other issues ===
On 24 January, about five members of Canadians Against Proroguing Parliament gathered at York University during a visit by Minister of Industry Tony Clement. In response to the protesters, Clement commented that "We have a government that is focused on the economy, focused on safer streets and focused on research and development. If you don't agree with that, which is your right, then you can vote us out of office. That's democracy." On 28 January, in response to the protests, Michael L. MacDonald, a Conservative member who was appointed to the Senate of Canada by Stephen Harper, stated that prorogation is a "common occurrence".

On 28 January, results from an EKOS poll showed that the Liberals were ahead of the Conservatives, despite Harper's focus on relief efforts following the 2010 Haiti earthquake.

Also on 28 January, Conservative Party supporter Michael Bliss, a historian and member of the Order of Canada, wrote in the Globe and Mail that the opposition's response to prorogation was "to keep the pot boiling, largely by playing on public ignorance of the workings of government" and that the effect of prorogation will be that "Some useful government bills are going to have to be reintroduced. The Afghan hearings, into events of several years ago, will be delayed for a few more weeks. And that's about it."

Since the prorogation is scheduled to last until after the 12–28 February Olympics, this caused some outrage as some members of CAPP and other Canadians accused Harper of proroguing in order to attend the games. The Conservatives responded to this claim by pointing out that the federal government has relinquished back to the public the majority of tickets it received as a senior Olympic partner, and that Members of Parliament would be required to purchase their own tickets for Olympic events. Organizers have planned further protests, along with a "Torch Relay for Democracy" to coincide with the start of the Olympic Games, concluding in Ottawa by the end of the prorogation.

On 4 February, Conservative House whip Gordon O'Connor announced that the one-week Parliamentary break scheduled for March and the two-week Parliamentary break scheduled for April would be cancelled. This would add 25 sitting days to the Parliamentary calendar to make up for the 22 sitting days lost due to Parliament being prorogued.

== February protests ==
On 11 February 2010 when Stephen Harper visited Victoria, British Columbia, he was met by hundreds of protesters representing a range of causes including democracy, opposition to the Olympics, opposition to the seal hunt, opposition to oilsand development, support for safe-injection sites, saving Jordan River and support for medical cannabis. The protest was spearheaded by the Victoria chapter of "Canadians Against Proroguing Parliament" with the aim of showing Harper that Canadians are angry about his decision to suspend democracy, said organizer Melissa Farrance. "We want to show him the way back to Parliament so he can get back to work," she said.

On 12 Feb, another poll was done by Environics showing that "the opposition Liberals picked up support from 37 percent of decided voters, compared with 33 percent for the Conservatives." This, according to Reuters, was "a sign of discontent with the prime minister's decision to suspend Parliament until after the Olympics."

From 18 to 22 February, an Ipsos Reid poll was carried out which showed the Conservatives had regained their lead, with the Conservatives picking up support of 37 percent of decided votes, with the Liberals falling to 29%.

A survey conducted 18–28 Feb. by The Canadian Press/Harris-Decima Research gave the Tories and Liberals 31 per cent each. The NDP had support from 16 per cent of respondents, the Greens 12 and the Bloc Québécois 8.

== March activities ==
On 2 March 2010, the protest movement called "Canadians Against Proroguing Parliament" transformed itself into a non-profit group called "Canadians Advocating Political Participation" to encourage further involvement in the political process.

On 3 March 2010, the prorogation debate was still on fire as MPs returned to work. On 2 March, NDP Leader Jack Layton said his party wanted an emergency debate to set out rules governing when and how Parliament can be shut down. Layton said he was discussing with other leaders "how to stop a prime minister from stepping in and putting a stop to the democratic process." On 2 March, Liberal Leader Michael Ignatieff said his party supported limits on the power to prorogue.

== See also ==
- Anything But Conservative
- Canadian Afghan detainee issue
- Harper government
- Legislative session procedure in Commonwealth realms
- Long Parliament
- Opinion polling in the 41st Canadian federal election
- Parliament of Canada
- Prorogation in Canada
- Timeline of the Canadian Afghan detainee issue
- 2008–2009 Canadian parliamentary dispute
