= Canadian Afghan detainee issue =

Abusive treatment of detainees in Afghanistan

The Canadian Afghan detainee issue concerns Government of Canada or the Canadian Forces (CF) knowledge of abusive treatment of detainees in Afghanistan. The abuse occurred after Afghans were detained by Canadian Forces, and subsequently transferred to the Afghan National Army (ANA) or the Afghan National Directorate of Security (NDS) during the War in Afghanistan. The issue has sparked heated debate since Article 12 of the Third Geneva Convention (of which Canada is a signatory) states that "the Detaining Power [Canada] is responsible for the treatment given [to prisoners of war]". If the allegations of torture are true it would mean Canada is guilty of war crimes.

The allegations were first sparked by University of Ottawa law professor Amir Attaran, who claimed that full versions of government documents proved Canada had willful knowledge that torture would occur before handing detainees to Afghan authorities. Subsequent to this, two official complaints have led to official investigations and hearings by the Military Police Complaints Commission (MPCC). One of these unveiled parliamentary testimony by diplomat Richard Colvin, who claimed that many detainees were probably tortured, and it was a standard operating procedure for Afghan interrogators. The allegations have led to a showdown in the House of Commons of Canada, as opposition Members of Parliament (MPs) had called for the releasing of relevant documents in full and unredacted form, claiming parliamentary privilege to see them. The government maintained that they had a duty to protect Canadian soldiers and citizens as the documents contained sensitive information.

At the request of the Speaker of the House of Commons of Canada, a panel of former justices and selected MPs was tasked with sorting through the documents, and determining the need to release or withhold them. To date, only about 4,000 out of the estimated 40,000 documents have been released, A final report released in June 2012 found no wrongdoing by Canadian Forces members, but did issue recommendations related to improving military policing and MPCC access to information and witnesses. The Canadian public generally held views that there was knowledge of detainee abuse by military or government officials. The issue has also led to scrutiny on detainee treatment by other Canadian departments and the armed forces of other nations.

== Background ==
Canada's military involvement in Afghanistan began in 2002 with the International Security Assistance Force (ISAF), a coalition of soldiers from 42 countries, which was tasked as a counterinsurgency effort in response to the 11 September attacks. ISAF had initially been established as a stabilization force by the United Nations Security Council on 20 December 2001, to secure Kabul. The Canadian Liberal government at the time, under Prime Minister Jean Chrétien, chose to have the Canadian Forces (CF) hand over its prisoners to the United States, who led the fight against al-Qaeda and other insurgents. After NATO took command of Afghanistan in 2003, Abu Ghraib torture and prisoner abuse at the hands of the United States armed forces in Iraq came to the attention of the public, and Canada soon faced pressure to hand their prisoners to someone else. Canada entered into an agreement with the Afghan government and started transferring detainees to Afghan security forces, which comprised the Afghan National Army (ANA) and the Afghan National Directorate of Security (NDS).

On 18 December 2005, then-Chief of Defence Staff Rick Hillier signed an agreement between Canada's Department of National Defence and the Government of Afghanistan. The agreement did not include any explicit right of access by Canada to Afghan detainees. Members of the opposition requested then-Minister of National Defence Gordon O'Connor to renegotiate the prisoner transfer agreement. This request was dismissed, with O'Connor saying the International Committee of the Red Cross and the Red Crescent fulfilled the duty of ensuring fair treatment of detainees and Canada could be notified and take action in any cases of abuse. However, the Red Cross stated that their mandate was being misunderstood, and it was the responsibility of Canada. It maintained that it had no role in monitoring the Canada-Afghanistan detainee-transfer agreement, and that following long-established operating procedure, the Red Cross would not reveal to any foreign government any abuses it might find in Afghan prisons. While maintaining that detainee monitoring was the Red Cross's duty until March 2007, O'Connor apologized to the House of Commons for previously misleading them on the issue. In turn, a new agreement was reached in April 2007 that allowed Canadian officials to have access to Kandahar jails.

== History ==
=== Initial allegations ===
The first allegations of detainee abuse came in early February 2007, when University of Ottawa law professor Amir Attaran produced documents he had received through an access-to-information request showing that three prisoners in the custody of Canadian military police were brought in by their Afghan interrogator for treatment of similar injuries to the head and upper body, all on the same day. Attaran argued this could be evidence of torture on the part of the interrogator and should be investigated. Attaran has maintained these allegations, stating in 2010 that the documents show torture of detainees was an actual tactic used to obtain information during interrogation.

In April 2007, The Globe and Mail published interviews with 30 men who claimed they were "beaten, starved, frozen and choked after they were handed over to Afghanistan's National Directorate of Security" by CF members. It also revealed that it had received a censored report by the Canadian government on human rights in Afghanistan through an access to information request, and it contained "negative references to acts such as torture, abuse, and extra judicial killings [that] were blacked out without an explanation". This prompted intensive questioning in the House, to which O'Connor claimed that a new agreement had been reached, saying "we have, in the last few days, entered into a local agreement in the Kandahar province to enter the detention facilities any time we want". This would be reaffirmed by prime minister Stephen Harper, stating that there was "no evidence that access is blocked to the prisons", and that Afghan authorities had agreed to "formalize that agreement so there is no potential misunderstanding". Regardless, NATO secretary general Jaap de Hoop Scheffer announced that the Afghan government was to launch an inquiry about the fate of detainees. In January 2008, it was revealed that the government ceased the detainee transfers after an internal investigation revealed allegations of a detainee being abused on 5 November 2007.

=== Richard Colvin testimony ===
Allegations regarding the treatment of Afghan detainees resurfaced in November 2009 via parliamentary testimony by Richard Colvin, the second highest-ranked member of Canada's diplomatic service in Afghanistan from 2006 to 2007. Colvin claimed that many detainees were probably tortured, and it was a standard operating procedure for Afghan interrogators. This was consistent with special reports by the United Nations Human Rights Commission and the US Department of State. Colvin also said the torture involved beatings, whipping with power cables, the use of electricity, knives, open flames and rape. The Canadian government dismissed opposition calls for a public inquiry the next day. "There has not been a single, solitary proven allegation of abuse involving a transferred Taliban prisoner by Canadian forces", Defence Minister Peter MacKay said in the House of Commons, with his parliamentary secretary suggesting Colvin was not credible.

Regardless, Colvin would provide further testimony in a hearing at the MPCC. He stated that upon visiting Kandahar province's main prison in May 2006, he discovered the ICRC had a "serious problem" with trying to keep track of Afghan prisoners. Officials had approached Colvin with "forceful" concerns about the lack of information given to them by Canada, causing them to lose "many, if not most – and possibly all – of our detainees", stated Colvin. He has also presented allegations that Canadian government and military officials knew about reports of abuse and human rights violations surrounding former governor of Kandahar Asadullah Khalid, saying Canadian officials heard credible sources claiming that Khalid ran a drug network, used drugs himself, used private detention facilities, and sexually abused young girls. Colvin is not the only civil servant to indicate there was a problem about Afghan detainees. Eileen Olexiuk, another Canadian diplomat in Afghanistan, also revealed in an interview with the CBC that she had warned the government in 2005 about torture problems. She said that the government, which was under the leadership of Paul Martin at the time, ignored her advice.

=== Subsequent allegations ===
On 8 December 2009, General Walter Natynczyk testified before a parliamentary committee that one particular detainee that was abused on 14 June 2006 by Afghan police was never in CF custody. Canada's chief commander stated that although CF members had questioned the man, he was taken into custody by Afghan police, and Canadian troops rescued him when the police started beating him with their shoes. However, the general corrected himself the following day upon receiving new information that the man had in fact been in Canadian custody. This would be the first piece of evidence that Afghan detainees in Canadian custody were subsequently abused by Afghan officials, contrary to government claims that there was no such evidence. It prompted opposition MPs to recall for a public inquiry into the matter, and for Peter MacKay to be fired. Canada's top military commander subsequently ordered an inquiry to find out why he had not been informed about this incident. This inquiry revealed many Canadian soldiers were aware that Afghan security forces beat prisoners "in the street and elsewhere" on a regular basis. A separate report to General Natynczyk also concluded that the detainee beaten in June 2006 was not defined as a Canadian detainee, preventing it from being reported up the chain of command, and that the CF and Department of Defence should "be tasked to examine the detainee reporting process ... to develop one consolidated process for the reporting on [Canadian Forces] detainees".

The United Nations (UN) has released at least two reports implicating torture in Afghanistan. A report from April 2010 stated the "use of harsh interrogation techniques and forced confession of guilt by the Afghan National Police and the National Directorate of Security was documented, including the use of electric shocks and beating", against juvenile detainees suspected of being involved in insurgency. This became concerning after a briefing note to Peter MacKay stated that many juvenile detainees were arrested by the CF, and transferred to the NDS, as per CF policy for all detainees under the age of 18. It also stated juvenile detainees were being kept in a Canadian transfer facility in Kandahar for "a significant period".

Another report by the UN was released in October 2011. Interviews with 379 detainees at 47 facilities over the period of a year found "a compelling pattern and practice of systematic torture and ill-treatment" at multiple facilities operated by the ANP and NDS, after 46% of the detainees it spoke with indicated it occurred. A written statement by the Afghan government denied the 'systematic' nature of torture and claimed the report was exaggerated, although it admitted to deficiencies due to a lack of training and resources. The report also suggested that detainees handed over by the CF received different treatment, with one case citing a man who stated everyone was treated badly unless they were handled by Canadians.

=== Investigations and inquiries ===
While the first specific allegations of abuse surfaced more than three years ago, there has been no official public inquiry. MPs in the House of Commons voted 146 to 129 in favour of a motion to set one up, but the prime minister has refused to consider it, stating that "the government of Canada has taken all necessary actions in all instances where there is proof of abuse of Afghan prisoners". Some critics and the Speaker of the House of Commons have also scolded both the government and opposition MPs for using the issue for political gain. Opposition MPs have stated that it should not be left to the military to investigate itself through the MPCC.

To date, there have been two main investigations conducted by the MPCC in relation to Afghan detainees. The first was launched on 9 February 2007 after a formal complaint by Amir Attaran regarding the treatment of three specific detainees arrested in Kandahar region in April 2006. The findings from this investigation stated that CF members handled the detainees appropriately, and were given medical treatment. However, the MPCC also found that the CF failed to conduct an investigation into how one of the detainees became injured, contrary to normal direction.

The second investigation was launched on 26 February 2007, following a joint complaint between Amnesty International Canada and the British Columbia Civil Liberties Association, alleging CF military police transferred detainees while there was enough evidence to suggest they would be tortured on at least 18 occasions. The investigation was moved to a public hearing process on 12 March 2008, mainly due to "delays and difficulties in obtaining relevant documents and information from government authorities". This triggered legal challenges from the federal government over the MPCC's jurisdiction to investigate such complaints, resulting in a ruling that the MPCC had no jurisdiction over "transfer complaints", but it did over "failure to investigate" complaints. During substantial testimony and hearings throughout 2010, the government engaged the MPCC another three times for judicial review of the MPCC findings, including the testimony of Richard Colvin. A judge dismissed these challenges in September 2011.

The MPCC released its report on 27 June 2012. No wrongdoing was found against specific Canadian Forces members, but the report "identified serious problems regarding reporting, accountability and information sharing". Four recommendations were made in the report to specifically improve the work of Canadian Forces Military Police that are deployed on missions, as well as improving document disclosure and witness access during MPCC hearings.

== Dispute over documents and parliamentary committees ==
=== Beginning of calls and prorogation ===
Opposition MPs in the House of Commons began calling for all documents the government possessed regarding the detainee issue to be made public since Richard Colvin's testimony in November 2009. Minister of Foreign Affairs Lawrence Cannon assured the House of Commons that the documents would be handed over to a special committee in charge of looking into the issue. "There's a mandatory obligation on public officials to ensure that when information is released that it is in compliance with the Canada Evidence Act [to avoid security risks]", according to Minister of Defence Peter MacKay. However, opposition MPs and other critics stated that this was an absurd argument, as Parliament has the constitutional right to have access to the documents uncensored. On 10 December 2009, the House of Commons passed a motion requiring the release of unredacted documents concerning the Afghan detainees to the committee hearing the issue. However, the government refused to abide by the motion. Critics repeated that the government was violating the Constitution of Canada and would be in contempt of Parliament if it continued to refuse to release the uncensored documents.

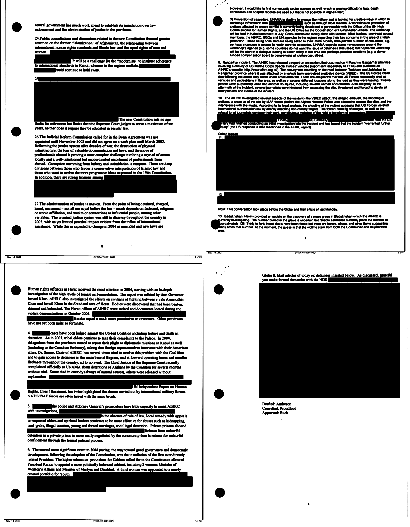
A select group of MPs and an independent panel of 3 jurists are responsible for determining what documents are relevant to allegations of detainee abuse, and how to release them to the public.

On 30 December 2009, the parliamentary session was put on hold by being prorogued at the request of the prime minister. According to his spokesman, he sought this prorogation to consult with Canadians about the economy. The move caused cries from opposition MPs who labelled it as an attempt to "muzzle parliamentarians amid controversy over the Afghan detainees affair". Prorogation prevented the parliamentary committee from continuing to probe the issue. Although informal committee meetings continued, they had no power to compel testimony or grant immunity, and Conservative MPs would not be represented.

=== Parliament resumes and 2010 release ===
Justice Minister Rob Nicholson announced to the House of Commons on 5 March 2010 that former Supreme Court of Canada judge Frank Iacobucci was appointed to advise Nicholson if any "injurious" effects would result from making the Afghan detainee documents public. However, University of Ottawa law professor Amir Attaran pointed out that Iacobucci was not a sitting judge and therefore had no power except to give lawyer advice to Nicholson. The opposition expressed deep disappointment with the decision, saying that they did not doubt the competence of the former justice, but believed that it was nothing more than another way to delay the issue. While parliamentarians were not given the Terms of Reference posed to Iacobucci immediately, they were released on 13 March 2010.

The government finally released thousands of documents to MPs at the end of March 2010. The documents immediately drew fierce criticism by the opposition, because they were still heavily redacted, and the "totally incoherent and totally disorderly" fashion of handing them out in a single copy and only in English instead of both of Canada's official languages. The government maintained that redactions are required to protect Canada, with Justice Minister Rob Nicholson stating they were done by "non-partisan public servants whose only interest is the protection of national security".

=== Speaker's question and ruling ===
On 18 March, the three opposition parties united in a bid to force the government to let them look at uncensored documents on the Afghan detainees affair or face parliamentary contempt proceedings. Specifically, they called on the Speaker of the House of Commons, Peter Milliken, to rule that the government violated collective parliamentary privilege #5 in refusing to hand over uncensored documents on the transfer of Afghan detainees. MPs have claimed that the request from Parliament was based on "340 years of bedrock constitutional history", and that there are systems in place to decide what is and is not appropriate to release to the public. Referring to those "systems", Reg Whitaker noted that members of the "Military Police Complaints Commission, whose investigation of the Afghan detainee issue actually led to the calling of the parliamentary inquiry ... are [already] fully security cleared [to see the unredacted documents]".

The Speaker first asked for comments from government and opposition MPs, including Peter MacKay, Rob Nicholson, Derek Lee, Jack Harris, Tom Lukiwski, and Jim Abbott. After considering the matter for two weeks, the Speaker ruled on 27 April 2010 that Parliament had a right to ask for uncensored documents. He asked that all House leaders, ministers and MPs to come to a collective solution "without compromising the security and confidentiality contained". The Speaker gave the House until 11 May 2010 to find a common ground. While MPs within the negotiations had to ask the Speaker for an extension of the deadline, it was granted until 14 May, and a deal was reached that morning. A Memorandum of Understanding on the particulars was not established until 16 June, when it was actually tabled in the House of Commons. The New Democratic Party refused to endorse the deal.

=== Panel work and 2011 release ===
A panel of MPs began the task of going through over 40,000 documents related to Afghan detainees on 10 July 2010. The MPs, consisting of one member and one alternate from the Liberal, Conservative and Bloc parties, determines what is relevant to the allegations of abuse. An independent panel of jurists determines how documents will be released publicly, in some cases censoring documents that may threaten national security, international relations, or soldiers in Afghanistan. This panel consists of Frank Iacobucci, fellow former Supreme Court justice Claire L'Heureux-Dubé and former B.C. Supreme Court judge Donald Brenner. Any documents that the government claims to contain legal advice may force the panel to determine whether to allow the MPs to see them.

Approximately 4,000 documents were released by the government on 22 June 2011, almost a year after the panel began its work. Foreign Affairs Minister John Baird stated that the process had come to an end, "and accusations of improper conduct are unfounded". However, there are an estimated 36,000 pages still remaining that have not been released in a less-redacted form. Based on the documents that were released, MP Stéphane Dion implied that they were cause for concern, and "The likelihood is very high" that a detainee was abused while in the custody of Afghan authorities. "I don't think Canadians will accept that it's over", he added.

== Related abuse allegations ==
=== Canada ===
In March 2010, The Canadian Press reported that documents filed with the MPCC showed that the Canadian Security Intelligence Service (CSIS) had started playing a role in the interrogation of Afghans captured by the CF. Sources say the military's decision to hand captives over to the NDS was sometimes based on the recommendations of CSIS interrogators, but Canadian military officials always delivered the final decision. This prompted CSIS to undertake a review of its dealings with Afghan detainees "to ensure that the Service can ... account for its engagement during this period". Briefing notes to CSIS director Dick Fadden state that the service interrogated up to 50 prisoners (between 2002 through late 2007 according to an assistant director with the service), but insists that they were treated properly. The notes also state "CSIS officers have been serving alongside the Canadian Forces" while armed, and affirms that agents had no role in determining whether prisoners should be transferred to Afghan authorities.

It is believed that initial investigations into the treatment of Afghan detainees sparked investigations into Canada's elite military unit, Joint Task Force 2 (JTF2). The first investigation, named Sand Trap, examined allegations that a JTF2 member was involved in the 2006 shooting death of an Afghan who was surrendering. No charges were laid at the conclusion of the investigation. However, a larger investigation called Sand Trap II began hearing from witnesses in May 2009 regarding allegations of JTF2 members witnessing United States Armed Forces killing an unarmed man. This investigation is still being conducted by the Canadian Forces National Investigation Service, and it has led to calls for civilian oversight of JTF2.

=== International ===
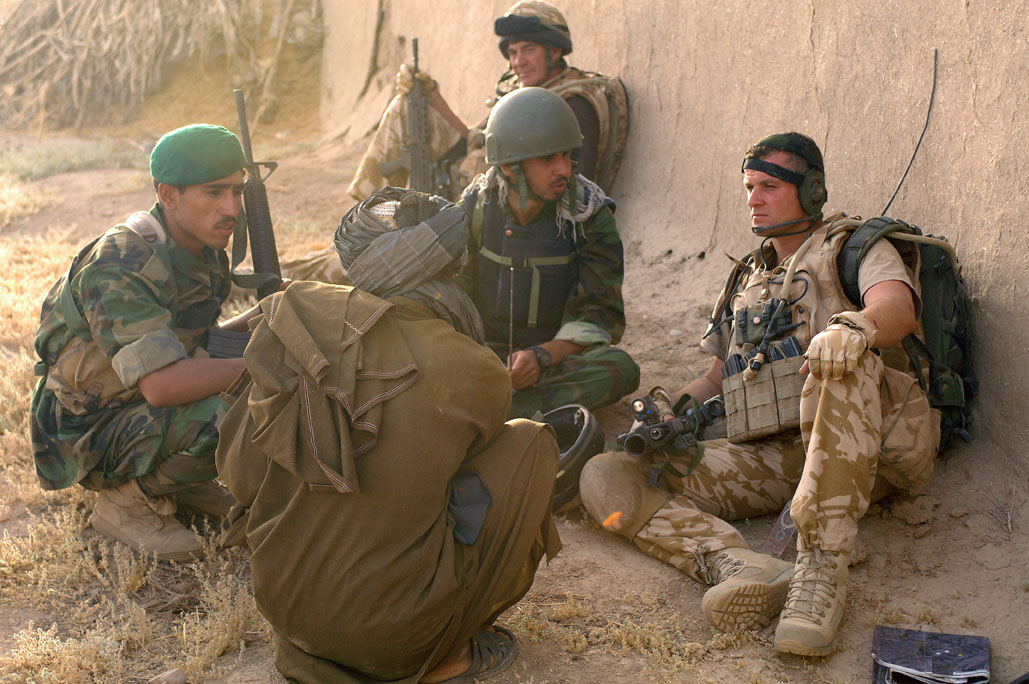
The High Court of Justice declared on 25 June 2010 that there was "a possibility of torture and serious mistreatment" of prisoners transferred by British soldiers to Afghan authorities.

There are also allegations that the NDS tortured detainees handed over to them by British soldiers in Afghanistan. Allegations were also made that British Armed Forces have received evidence of this torture, and NATO "has buried its head in the sand while torture has continued, and it's known about it". The British High Court of Justice ruled on 25 June 2010 that there was "a possibility of torture and serious mistreatment" of prisoners. It is now illegal for British troops to hand over detainees to the NDS in Kabul, however the High Court still approved of transfers in Kandahar and Helmand provinces. This was on the condition that government and military officials improved its systems for monitoring detainees to avoid "a real risk of torture or serious mistreatment".

On 6 September 2011, it was revealed that NATO had suspended transfers of detainees to several Afghan prisons. The move was prompted by a United Nations report published days later, which described "a compelling pattern and practice of systematic torture and ill-treatment" at a number of facilities run by the NDS and Afghan police. NATO stated it would be "prudent" in halting transfers until the claims could be verified.

== Public opinion ==
An EKOS poll conducted in December 2009 revealed that 83% of the respondents believed the government knew Afghan detainees were tortured. This was a consistent result across all age groups, genders and geographic locations. It also concluded that 41% of respondents were dissatisfied with the governments transparency on the issue, and only 24% were satisfied. The remaining 35% were still undecided or had no opinion. As time progressed, 61% of Canadians still believed Afghan detainees were tortured in May 2010, according to an Ipsos-Reid poll. This poll also found that 52% of respondents believed that Stephen Harper and Canadian soldiers knew torture was occurring, and 75% believed senior military officials would have known about the problem. A poll done by Angus Reid during 5 January and 6, found that 38 per cent of Canadians believed that Harper used 30 December 2009 prorogation to curtail the Canadian Afghan detainee issue.

== See also ==
- Bagram torture and prisoner abuse – Early 2000s torture by American soldiers in Bagram, Afghanistan
- Canada's role in the invasion of Afghanistan
- Canadian Forces casualties in Afghanistan – Canadian military fatalities during the War in Afghanistan
- International public opinion on the war in Afghanistan
- Opposition to the War in Afghanistan (2001–2021)
- Protests against the invasion of Afghanistan
