= Goodfellow =

Goodfellow is a surname with English, Scottish or Irish origins. Notable people with the surname include:

- Benjamin Goodfellow (1864–1946), British solicitor and philatelist
- Bill Goodfellow, Canadian Minister of Highways in the Ontario Department of Highways, 1961–1962
- Brent H. Goodfellow (born 1940), American politician
- Charles Augustus Goodfellow (1836–1915), English recipient of the Victoria Cross
- Daniel Goodfellow (born 1996), British diver
- Douglas Goodfellow (1917–2014), New Zealand businessman and philanthropist
- Ebbie Goodfellow (1906–1985), Canadian professional ice hockey player
- Elizabeth Goodfellow (c.1767–1851), American cooking instructor
- Fred Goodfellow (father of Herbert Goodfellow) (c. 1879–1925), rugby union and rugby league footballer who played in the 1890s through to the 1920s
- Frederick Goodfellow (1874–1960), British tug of war competitor
- Geoff Goodfellow (born 1956 California), American inventor of the wireless communicator that became the Blackberry
- George Goodfellow (cricketer) (1858–1892), Australian cricketer
- George E. Goodfellow (1855–1910), American physician and expert on gunshot wounds
- Gerald Goodfellow, U.S. Air Force brigadier general
- Herbert Goodfellow (son of Fred Goodfellow) (1916–1997), English rugby league footballer who played in the 1930s, 1940s and 1950s
- Ian Goodfellow, American computer scientist, engineer, and researcher
- James Goodfellow (born 1937), Scottish inventor
- Jimmy Goodfellow (1943–2020), former English professional footballer and manager
- Jimmy Goodfellow (footballer, born 1938) (1938–2011), Scottish footballer
- Joan Goodfellow (born 1950), American actress
- Dame Julia Goodfellow (born 1951), British biophysicist and academic administrator
- Kate Goodfellow (born 1989), Canadian rower
- Marc Goodfellow (born 1981), English professional football player
- Michael Goodfellow (1941–2024), English actinobacterial systematician
- Michael Goodfellow (curler) (born 1988), Scottish curler
- Mike Goodfellow (1866–1920), American baseball player
- Millard Preston Goodfellow (1892–1973), American journalist, publisher and diplomat
- Peter Goodfellow (geneticist) (born 1951), British geneticist
- Peter Goodfellow (politician), New Zealand businessman and politician
- Ryan Goodfellow (born 1993), Scottish footballer
- Rob Goodfellow (born 1960), Canadian-Australian author
- Syd Goodfellow (1915–1998), English footballer
- Walter Goodfellow (1866–1953), British zoological collector
- William Goodfellow (executive) (born 1947), American, founding member and Executive director of the Center for International Policy
- William Goodfellow (philanthropist) (1880–1974), New Zealand philanthropist

== Fictional characters ==
- Puck (Shakespeare), whose proper name is Robin Goodfellow
- Dr Goodfellow, a fictional character on the television series Buck Rogers in the 25th Century
- Sgt Goodfellow, a fictional character on the television series Father Brown
- Gordon Goodfellow, character in The Ickabog
- Robyn Goodfellowe and her father Bill Goodfellowe, characters in the animated film Wolfwalkers
