= William Goodfellow =

William Goodfellow may refer to:

- William Goodfellow (philanthropist) (1880–1974), New Zealand merchant, industrialist, company director and philanthropist
- William Goodfellow (executive) (born 1947), founding member and executive director of the Center for International Policy
- Bill Goodfellow (William Arthur Goodfellow, 1901–1983), politician in Ontario, Canada
- Douglas Goodfellow (William Douglas Goodfellow, 1917–2014), New Zealand businessman and philanthropist
