= New Zealand Democrat Party (1934) =

- Founder: Albert Davy and William Goodfellow
- Founded: 1934
- Dissolved: 1936; 89 years ago
- Merged into: National Party
- Ideology: Classical liberalism Minarchism
- Political position: Right-wing
- Colours: Blue

The New Zealand Democrat Party was a political party in New Zealand, founded in 1934 with the purpose of opposing socialist legislation by the government.

== Formation ==
The Democrat Party was founded and developed by Albert Davy, a prominent political organiser of the time. He had worked first for the Reform Party, then for the United Party, and finally for the Reform Party again. Davy was highly effective in both campaign management and fundraising but often came into conflict with those for whom he worked. Politically, Davy was an advocate of reducing the size of government and of minimising government intervention in the business world. The slogan "More Business in Government, Less Government in Business", which was once used by the Reform Party, was thought up by Davy.

When the United Party and the Reform Party formed a coalition, Davy initially supported it but later resigned in protest at the legislation the coalition enacted to counter the Great Depression. Davy denounced the coalition as "socialistic by inclination, action and fact".

In 1934, Davy was approached by William Goodfellow, a wealthy Auckland businessman and industrialist. Goodfellow strongly opposed the economic policies of the United-Reform Coalition, and was also concerned by the rise of the Labour Party. Goodfellow hoped that a small but committed party could hold the balance of power in Parliament and force the government to adopt more business-friendly policies. It was hoped by Goodfellow and his allies that Davy's talents could create an effective organisation.

Therefore, the New Zealand Democrat Party was founded. Its primary base of support was the business community, particularly in Auckland. Before long, however, Davy and Goodfellow came into conflict. The most notable cause for dispute was the scale of Davy's plans. Goodfellow had wanted a small party focused on winning a select few seats, but Davy was recruiting candidates as though the Democrats were a major party.

Goodfellow tried to remove Davy from the chairmanship of the Democrats in July 1935 and later initiated court proceedings to recover part of the salary Davy had been paid. Davy remained in office, however, and the Democrat Party continued on. The sitting Mayor of Wellington, Thomas Hislop, was recruited as the party's political leader, and Davy remained its chief organiser and strategist.

== 1935 election ==
In the 1935 elections, Davy's campaign was not as effective as his previous efforts. The Democrats fielded fifty-one candidates, including seven former United Party candidates and members of Parliament, including Bill Veitch and Arthur Stallworthy. However, the Democrats did not win any seats. In total, they won around 7.8% of the national vote (66,695 votes). Despite their failure to enter Parliament, their impact on the election may have been the opposite to what was intended; by splitting the anti-Labour vote, they probably contributed to Labour's overwhelming victory in 1935.

== Dissolution ==
Among the defeated Democrat candidates were Frederick Doidge and Matthew Oram, who would become future National Party MPs. Davy himself went on to found the People's Movement and the New Zealand Co-operative Party but eventually retired from politics and returned to business. The party's remnants amalgamated with the National Party in 1936.
