= International public opinion on the war in Afghanistan =

A 47-nation global survey of public opinion conducted in June 2007 by the Pew Global Attitudes Project found considerable opposition to the NATO military operations in Afghanistan. In 2 out of the 47 countries was there a majority that favoured keeping troops in Afghanistan – Israel (59%) and Kenya (60%). On the other hand, in 41 of the 47 countries pluralities wanted NATO troops out of Afghanistan as soon as possible. In 32 out of 47 countries majorities wanted NATO troops out of Afghanistan as soon as possible. Majorities in 7 out of 12 NATO member countries wanted troops withdrawn as soon as possible.

The 24-nation Pew Global Attitudes survey in June 2008 again found that majorities or pluralities in 21 of 24 countries wanted NATO troops removed from Afghanistan as soon as possible. In 3 out of the 24 countries – the U.S. (50%), Australia (60%), and Britain (48%) – public opinion favoured keeping troops there until the situation stabilized. Since then, public opinion in Australia and Britain has shifted, and the majority of Australians and British now also want their troops to be brought home from Afghanistan. Of the seven NATO countries in the survey, not one showed a majority in favor of keeping NATO troops in Afghanistan – one, the U.S., came close to a majority (50%). Of the other six NATO countries, five had majorities of their population wanting NATO troops removed from Afghanistan as soon as possible.

The 25-nation Pew Global Attitudes survey in June 2009 continued to find that the war in Afghanistan was unpopular in most nations and that most publics want American and NATO troops out of Afghanistan. The 2009 global survey reported that majorities or pluralities in 18 out of 25 countries wanted NATO to remove their troops from Afghanistan as soon as possible. (Changes from 2008 included Tanzania, South Africa, and Australia having been replaced by Israel, Kenya, the Palestinian Territories, and Canada in the survey, and shifts in opinions in India and Nigeria.) In 4 out of 25 countries was there a majority that favoured keeping NATO troops in Afghanistan – the U.S. (57%), Israel (59%), Kenya (56%), and Nigeria (52%). Despite American calls for NATO allies to send more troops to Afghanistan, there was majority or plurality opposition to such action in every one of the NATO countries surveyed: Germany (63% opposition), France (62%), Poland (57%), Canada (55%), Britain (51%), Spain (50%), and Turkey (49%).

In Europe, polls in France, Germany, Britain, and other countries showed that the European public wanted their troops to be pulled out and less money spent on the war in Afghanistan. In Afghanistan, 42% of Afghans rated U.S. efforts in the country positively in 2007, down steeply from 68% in 2005, and 57% in 2006. In 2007, 76% of Afghans rated the U.S.-led overthrow of the Taliban as "a good thing", down from 88% in 2006.

== International public opinion compared to American public opinion ==
In October 2001, a poll by CNN/Gallup/USA Today indicated that about 88% of Americans backed military action in Afghanistan, and a poll by Market Opinion Research indicated that about 65% of Britons supported having British troops involved. On the other hand, a large-scale 37-nation poll of world opinion carried out by Gallup International in late September 2001, found that majorities in most countries favoured a legal response, in the form of extradition and trial, over a military response to 9/11: In 3 of the 37 countries surveyed – the United States, Israel, and India – did majorities favour military action. In 34 out of the 37 countries surveyed, the survey found majorities that did not favour military action: in the United Kingdom (75%), France (67%), Switzerland (87%), Czech Republic (64%), Lithuania (83%), Panama (80%), Mexico (94%), etc.

This dichotomy between American and international public opinion on the military operations continues to be seen, although opposition to the war is growing in the U.S. as well. A Gallup poll conducted July 10–12, 2009 reported that the majority 61% of Americans do not think the U.S. made a mistake in sending military forces in 2001, while 36% of Americans do. 54% also thought things are going well for the U.S.. An Angus Reid poll conducted July 15–18, 2009, found that 55% of Americans support the military operation, while 35% oppose it. 49% of Americans thought their country did the right thing in sending military forces. About half, 48%, of Americans felt that they did not have a clear idea of what the war is about.

Outside the United States international public opinion has been largely opposed to the war. In a 47-nation June 2007 survey of global public opinion, the Pew Global Attitudes Project found considerable opposition to NATO operations. In 4 out of the 47 countries surveyed was there a majority that favoured keeping troops: the U.S. (50%), Israel (59%), Ghana (50%), and Kenya (60%). In 41 of the 47 countries, pluralities want NATO troops out as soon as possible. In 32 out of 47 countries, majorities want NATO troops out as soon as possible. Majorities in 7 out of 12 NATO member countries say troops should be withdrawn as soon as possible.

The 24-nation Pew Global Attitudes survey in June 2008 similarly found that majorities or pluralities in 21 of 24 countries want NATO to remove their troops as soon as possible. In 3 out of the 24 countries – the U.S. (50%), Australia (60%), and Britain (48%) – did public opinion lean more toward keeping troops there until the situation has stabilized. Since that poll, views in Britain and Australia have also diverged from public opinion in the United States, and majorities in both Britain and Australia now want their troops to be brought back home from the war. Of the seven NATO countries included in the survey, none showed a majority in favor of keeping NATO troops until the situation stabilised – only the United States came close to a majority (50%). Of the other six NATO countries, five had majorities of their population wanting NATO troops to be removed as soon as possible: Spain (56%), France (54%), Germany (54%), Poland (65%), and Turkey (72%).

The 25-nation Pew Global Attitudes survey in June 2009 continued to find the war to be unpopular in most nations, with most publics wanting American and NATO troops out as soon as possible. The 2009 global survey reported that majorities or pluralities in 18 out of 25 countries want NATO to remove their troops from Afghanistan as soon as possible. (Changes from the 2008 survey included Tanzania, South Africa, and Australia having been replaced by Israel, Kenya, the Palestinian Territories, and Canada in the survey, as well as shifts in opinions in India and Nigeria.) In 4 out of 25 countries was there a majority that favoured keeping NATO troops in Afghanistan – the U.S. (57%), Israel (59%), Kenya (56%), and Nigeria (52%). In 1 of the 8 NATO countries included in the survey – the U.S. – was there a majority in favour of keeping NATO troops until the situation stabilised. Despite repeated American calls for NATO allies to send more troops to Afghanistan, there was majority or plurality opposition to such action in all seven of the other NATO countries surveyed: Germany (63% disapprove), France (62%), Poland (57%), Canada (55%), Britain (51%), Spain (50%), and Turkey (49%).

The 22-nation Pew Global Attitudes survey released in June 2010 again continued to find the war unpopular in most nations. The poll reported that majorities or pluralities in 16 of 22 countries want the military forces to be withdrawn "as soon as possible". One country out of the 22 was there a majority that supported keeping troops until the situation stabilizes (57% in Kenya).

== United States ==
=== Growing opposition to the war ===
While support for the war continues to be strongest in the U.S. and Israel, recent polls have also shown growing opposition in the U.S., including majority opposition.

A Washington Post – ABC poll conducted July 15–18, 2009 found that just half of Americans, 51%, think the war is worth fighting, while nearly half, 45%, think the war is not worth fighting – a statistical tie within the poll's ±3 point margin of error. The American public is also closely divided on whether the United States is making significant progress toward winning the war, with 46% thinking so and 42% not.

An Associated Press – GfK poll conducted July 16–20, 2009 found that the majority 53% of Americans oppose the war, while 44% support it. It furthermore found that the plurality of Americans, 34%, strongly opposed the war, while 20% strongly favored it. (Another 19% somewhat opposed the war, 20% somewhat favored it, and 3% did not know or declined to answer.)

A CNN – Opinion Research poll conducted July 31 – August 3, 2009 also found that most Americans now oppose the war. In a new low in American public support for the war, 54% of Americans said they opposed the war, while 41% supported it.

Following the August 20, 2009 election in Afghanistan that was characterized by widespread lack of security and massive fraud, and capping off the two deadliest months for U.S. troops in the 8-year war, the CNN-Opinion Research poll conducted August 28–31, 2009 registered the highest level of opposition to the war the poll has yet seen. A majority 57% of Americans now oppose the war in Afghanistan, while 42% still support it.

A Washington Post – ABC News poll conducted September 10–12, 2009 reported that:

Americans are broadly skeptical of President Obama's contention that the war is necessary for the war against terrorism to be a success, and few see an increase in troops as the right thing to do.

The poll found that the plurality 42% of Americans now want a reduction of the number of U.S. troops in Afghanistan, and that 26% of Americans think more troops should be sent to Afghanistan.

The CNN – Opinion Research poll conducted September 11–13, 2009, found that American opposition to the war reached a new all-time high, while American support for the war fell to a new all-time low. The majority 58% of Americans now oppose the war, while 39% support it.

Keating Holland, CNN's polling director, observed that:

The Afghan war is almost as unpopular as the Iraq war has been for the past four years.

He noted that support for the war in Iraq had first dropped to 39 percent in June 2005 then generally remained in the low to mid-30s since.

The Associated Press – GfK poll conducted October 1–5, 2009 found the majority 57% of Americans oppose the war, up 4% from July, while 40% favor the war, down 4% from July.

The CNN / Opinion Research poll conducted October 30 – November 1, 2009 found that the majority 58% of Americans oppose the war, while 40% support it. The majority 56% of Americans also oppose sending more U.S. troops, while 42% favor doing so.

The Pew Research poll conducted October 28 – November 8, 2009 found that the majority 59% of Americans oppose sending more U.S. troops: The plurality 40% of Americans want the number of U.S. troops to be reduced, and 19% want the number of troops to remain unchanged. 32% support sending more U.S. troops.

The Gallup poll conducted November 5–8, 2009 found that the majority 51% of Americans oppose sending more U.S. troops: The plurality 44% of Americans want the number of U.S. troops to be reduced, and 7% want the number to be kept unchanged.

The Associated Press – GfK poll conducted November 5–9, 2009 again found that the majority 57% of Americans oppose the war, while 39% favor it.

The ABC News / Washington Post poll conducted November 12–15, 2009 found that the majority 52% of Americans now say the war is not worth fighting, a new high in opposition for the poll question first asked in 2007, and that 44% say it is worth fighting, a new low in support. The majority 76% of Americans do not feel that withdrawing would increase the risk of terrorism in the U.S. while 23% feel that it would.

The CNN / Opinion Research poll conducted December 16–20, 2009 found that the majority 55% of Americans oppose the war, while 43% support it.

The AP/GfK poll conducted January 12–17, 2010 found that the majority 54% of Americans oppose the war, while 43% support it. The plurality of Americans, 32%, "strongly oppose" the war, while 18% "strongly favor" it. The majority 55% of Americans oppose sending more U.S. troops, while 41% would support doing so. The plurality 34% of Americans "strongly oppose" sending more troops, while 17% "strongly favor" doing so.

The ABC News / Washington Post poll conducted April 22–25, 2010 showed that the majority 52% of Americans think the war has not been worth fighting, and the plurality 38% of Americans "strongly" think that it has not been worth fighting. 45% of Americans think that the war being carried out has been worth fighting, with 26% of Americans that feel that way strongly.

The CNN / Opinion Research poll conducted May 21–23, 2010 found that the majority 56% of Americans oppose their country's war, while 42% support it.

The ABC News / Washington Post poll conducted June 3–6, 2010 showed that the majority 53% of Americans think the war has not been worth fighting, and the plurality 41% of Americans "strongly" think that it has not been worth fighting. 44% of Americans think that the war being carried out has been worth fighting, with 26% of Americans that feel that way strongly.

The ABC News / Washington Post poll conducted July 7–11, 2010 found that 76% of Americans want to start withdrawing troops by next summer or sooner: 45% call Obama's plan to start withdrawing troops by next summer "about right", and an additional 31% call for the withdrawal to start even sooner. 18% think the withdrawal should start later. The majority 53% of Americans think the war has not been worth fighting, with the plurality 38% of Americans "strongly" feeling so. The poll reported that support for the war hit a new low in the United States: 43% of Americans think the war has been worth fighting, down sharply since the end of the previous year, and the lowest since the question was asked in February 2007.

The CBS News poll conducted July 9–12, 2010 found that the majority 58% of Americans want their troops withdrawn from the war within the next one or two years, and 35% were willing to have U.S. troops stay longer than two years from now. One-third, 33%, of Americans think large numbers of U.S. troops should be withdrawn in less than a year, another 23% think that should be done within one or two years, and 2% want an immediate withdrawal. 26% of Americans think U.S. troops should remain for as long as it takes, 7% think they should stay another two to five years, and 2% think they should stay for another five to ten years.

The CNN / Opinion Research poll conducted August 6–10, 2010 showed the American public's opposition to the war at an all-time high. The majority 62% of Americans oppose the war, the highest level since the poll question was asked in 2006, while 37% favored the war, an all-time low.

The CNN / Opinion Research poll conducted December 17–19, 2010 again showed the American public's opposition to the war reaching a new all-time high. The majority 63% of Americans oppose the war, the highest level reached since the poll question was asked in 2006, while 35% favored the war, again a new all-time low.

Opposition by the American public to the war also reached an all-time high in polling by ABC News and the Washington Post in December 2010. A record 60% majority of Americans say the war has not been worth fighting, while 34% say it has, a new record low of support of the war. The unpopularity of the war has now reached the levels seen for the war in Iraq. 81% of Americans want the withdrawal of American military forces to begin within a few months – either in the summer of 2011 as pledged by President Obama, or even sooner than that.

In January 2011, the USA Today / Gallup poll of January 14–16 reported that the majority 72% of Americans want the withdrawal of U.S. troops from Afghanistan to be accelerated – including majorities in the three political groups – while 25% disagree. Of note, the plurality of Americans, 41%, "strongly" favor speeding up the withdrawal, while 6% "strongly" oppose doing so.

In March 2011, the Washington Post / ABC News poll of March 10–13 reported that the majority 64% of Americans say that the war is no longer worth fighting – the highest level of American opposition to the war measured by the poll – while 31% thought it was – the lowest level of support to date. Nearly three-quarters of Americans, 73%, want President Obama to withdraw a "substantial number" of troops this summer – while 21% do not. Nearly half of Americans, the plurality 49%, "strongly" think the war is not worth fighting, while 17% strongly think it is.

Following the killing of Osama bin Laden, the USA Today / Gallup poll of May 5–8, 2011, reported that the majority 59% of Americans think the U.S. has finished its work and its troops should be brought home. 36% disagreed, and not a single major demographic group had a majority that favored keeping U.S. military forces in Afghanistan.

The Associated Press – GfK poll conducted May 5–9, 2011 reported that the majority 59% of Americans oppose the war, with the plurality 32% of Americans "strongly" opposed to it. 37% of Americans favored the war, the lowest level of support to date. The majority 80% of Americans approve of President Barack Obama's decision to end all U.S. combat operations by 2014 and to begin the withdrawal of troops in July, with the plurality 52% "strongly" approving the ending of combat operations. 15% disapproved, with 8% "strongly" disapproving. The majority 83% of Americans think the announced pace of withdrawal is either about right or too slow, while 15% think it is too fast.

The CBS News / New York Times poll of June 24–28, 2011 reported that the majority 58% of Americans oppose the U.S. military involvement in Afghanistan – the highest level of opposition yet recorded by the poll – while 35% thought the U.S. was doing the "right thing" in fighting its war. 79% of Americans approve of the announced withdrawal of all U.S. troops by the end of 2014, with 59% of Americans wanting even more than one-third of all U.S. troops withdrawn within the next year, by the end of summer 2012. Altogether, 85% of Americans – including the 75% of Republicans – want at least one-third of U.S. troops withdrawn within the next year, by the end of summer 2012.

In January 2013, the Media and Public Opinion Research Group reported that most Americans want the U.S. to pull out of Afghanistan: 37% think the U.S. should withdraw troops gradually, while 30.2% say the U.S. should withdraw immediately.

In December 2013, a CNN/ORC International poll revealed that 17% supported the Afghanistan war.

The Pew Research Center poll released at the 10th anniversary of the U.S. invasion reported that the majority 52% of Americans think that, considering the costs versus the benefits to the United States, the war has not been worth fighting, while 41% think it has.

"Do you favor or oppose the U.S. war in Afghanistan?"
Date	Favor	Oppose	Unsure
Jun. 3–7, 2011	36%	**62%**	2%
May 2, 2011	42%	**52%**	5%
Jan. 21–23, 2011	40%	**58%**	1%
Dec. 17–19, 2010	35%	**63%**	5%
Oct. 5–7, 2010	37%	**58%**	5%
Sep. 21–23, 2010	39%	**58%**	3%
Sep. 1–2, 2010	41%	**57%**	2%
Aug. 6–10, 2010	37%	**62%**	1%
May 21–23, 2010	42%	**56%**	2%
Mar. 19–21, 2010	48%	49%	3%
Jan. 22–24, 2010	47%	52%	1%
Dec. 16–20, 2009	43%	**55%**	3%
Dec. 2–3, 2009	46%	51%	2%
Nov. 13–15, 2009	45%	**52%**	3%
Oct. 30 – Nov. 1, 2009	40%	**58%**	2%
Oct. 16–18, 2009	41%	**57%**	2%
Sep. 11–13, 2009	39%	**58%**	3%
Aug. 28–31, 2009	42%	**57%**	2%
Jul. 31 – Aug. 3, 2009	41%	**54%**	5%
May 14–17, 2009	50%	48%	3%
Apr. 3–5, 2009	**53%**	46%	1%
Feb. 18–19, 2009	47%	51%	2%
Dec. 1–2, 2008	52%	46%	2%
Jul. 27–29, 2008	46%	52%	2%
Jan. 19–21, 2007	44%	**52%**	4%
Sep. 22–24, 2006	50%	48%	2%

(Pluralities over the ±3 margin of error indicated in bold. Lowest levels indicated in italics. Source: CNN/Opinion Research Corporation)

"Do you favor or oppose the war in Afghanistan?"
Date	Favor	Oppose	Don't know / Refused
May 5–9, 2011	37%	**59%**	3%
Sep. 8–13, 2010	37%	**62%**	3%
Aug. 11–16, 2010	38%	**58%**	3%
Mar. 3–8, 2010	46%	50%	3%
Jan. 12–17, 2010	43%	**54%**	3%
Dec. 10–14, 2009	39%	**57%**	4%
Nov. 5–9, 2009	39%	**57%**	4%
Oct. 1–5, 2009	40%	**57%**	3%
Jul. 16–20, 2009	44%	**53%**	4%

(Pluralities over the ±3% margin of error indicated in bold. Lowest levels indicated in italics. Source: AP/GfK)

"Do you think the U.S. doing the right thing fighting the war in Afghanistan now, or should the U.S. not be involved in Afghanistan now?"
Date	Right thing	Should not be involved	Unsure
September 28 – October 2, 2011	34%	**57%**	9%
June 24–28, 2011	35%	**58%**	7%
June 3–7, 2011	43%	**51%**	6%
March 18–21, 2011	39%	**53%**	8%
February 11–14, 2011	37%	**54%**	9%
September 10–14, 2010	38%	**54%**	8%
August 20–24, 2010	43%	48%	9%
December 4–8, 2009	**49%**	39%	11%
October 5–8, 2009	**51%**	39%	10%
September 19–23, 2009	47%	42%	11%

(Pluralities over the ±3% margin of error indicated in bold. Lowest levels indicated in italics. Source: CBS News)

=== Dichotomy between Republicans and Democrats ===
A dichotomy between Republicans and Democrats exists as well. The Associated Press – GfK poll conducted July 16–20, 2009 found 66% of Republicans favoring the war, while 26% of Democrats do.

The CNN – Opinion Research poll conducted July 31 – August 3, 2009 found that nearly two-thirds of Republicans support the war, while three quarters of Democrats oppose the war. CNN polling director Keating Holland said:

Afghanistan is almost certainly the Obama policy that Republicans like the most.

An ABC News-Washington Post poll conducted August 13–17, 2009 found that 78% of conservative Republicans think the war is worth fighting, while 22% of liberal Democrats do. 65% of conservative Republicans also think that the U.S. is winning the war. 64% of liberal Democrats want the number of U.S. troopsto be reduced, while 22% of conservative Republicans do.

A McClatchy-Ipsos poll conducted August 27–31, 2009, reported that 66% of Democrats and 67% of independents oppose sending more U.S. troops. In one group was there a majority in favor of sending more troops, with 52% of Republicans favoring a further escalation.

The CNN – Opinion Research poll conducted August 28–31, 2009 again showed that most of the support for the war is from Republicans. Seven in ten Republicans support the war, while nearly three quarters of Democrats oppose the war, as do 57% of independents.

The Washington Post – ABC News poll conducted September 10–12, 2009 found that the majority 56% of Democrats want a reduction of the number of U.S. troops, while the plurality 39% of Republicans want more troops to be sent to the war. 17% of Democrats support sending more troops. The poll also reported that the majority 59% of Democrats think the "war on terrorism" can be a success without winning, while the majority 66% of Republicans think the war must be won to win the "war on terrorism".

The CNN – Opinion Research poll conducted September 11–13, 2009 found that 23% of Democrats and 39% independents support the war, while a majority 62% of Republicans support the war. The majority 75% of Democrats oppose the war.

The USA Today – Gallup poll conducted September 22–23, 2009 found that the majority 62% of Democrats oppose sending more U.S. troops, while the majority 63% of Republicans favor sending more U.S. troops. The majority 53% of Democrats want to begin a withdrawal of U.S. troops, while 24% of Republicans want a withdrawal to begin. 30% of Democrats support sending more U.S. troops. Nearly half, 49% of independents oppose sending more U.S. troops, and the plurality 43% of independents also want to begin to withdraw U.S. troops from Afghanistan.

The Pew Research Center poll conducted September 10–15, 2009 found that 56% of Democrats want to remove NATO troops "as soon as possible", while, in contrast, 71% of Republicans favor keeping them. By nearly two to one, 55% to 29%, Republicans also thought the U.S. is making progress rather than losing ground in defeating the Taliban militarily. Among Democrats and independents 46% and 49%, respectively, said the U.S. is losing ground in defeating the Taliban militarily.

The Associated Press – GfK poll conducted October 1–5, 2009 found that the majority 57% of Democrats oppose sending more troops, while, on the other hand, the majority 69% of Republicans favor sending more troops there.

The Clarus Research poll conducted October 1–4, 2009, found that 17% of Democrats supported sending more troops. The majority 61% of Democrats want to "decrease U.S. troop numbers in Afghanistan and begin to get out". The majority 54% of Republicans favor sending more U.S. troops. Ron Faucheux, president of Clarus Research Group, said:

Should President Obama decide to send more troops to Afghanistan, he will do it in the face of strong opposition from voters in his own party.

In a USA Today / Gallup poll conducted October 6, 2009, 59% of Democrats, and 50% of independents, opposed sending more troops, while 73% of Republicans favored sending more troops. Half, 50%, of Democrats wanted President Obama to begin to withdraw U.S. troops, while 18% of Republicans wanted this.

In the CBS News poll conducted October 5–8, 2009, the majority 52% of Democrats wanted to decrease the number of U.S. troops, while the majority 57% of Republicans wanted to increase the number of U.S. troops. 27% of Democrats support sending more troops. The majority 76% of Republicans think the U.S. is doing the right thing by fighting the war, while, on the other hand, the plurality 49% of Democrats think the U.S. should not be involved.

In the ABC News – Washington Post poll conducted October 15–18, 2009, the majority 60% of Democrats opposed sending more U.S. troops, while the majority 69% of Republicans favored sending more troops. 36% of Democrats felt the war was worth fighting, while 71% of Republicans did.

In the Pew Research poll conducted October 28 – November 8, 2009, the majority 70% of Democrats oppose sending more U.S. troops, while 48% of Republicans favor sending more troops there. The plurality 50% of Democrats want the number of U.S. troops in Afghanistan to be reduced, while 25% of Republicans did as well.

In the Gallup poll conducted November 5–8, 2009, the majority 66% of Democrats oppose sending more U.S. troops, while 63% of Republicans want to send more troops. The majority 60% of Democrats want President Obama to, in fact, begin reducing U.S. troop levels. 26% of Republicans wanted a reduction in troops to begin. Gallup noted:

In the ABC News / Washington Post poll conducted November 12–15, 2009, the political divide in the U.S. over the war continued: the majority 66% of Democrats say the war is not worth fighting, with nearly half of Democrats, 48%, feeling strongly that the war is not worth fighting, while, on the other hand, the majority 60% of Republicans say that it is worth fighting, with 43% of Republicans feeling strongly that it is.

The CNN / Opinion Research poll conducted May 21–23, 2010 noted that the war remained popular with Republicans, with a majority two-thirds of them favoring continuation of the war. 27% of Democrats supported the war, and among independents support has fallen to 40%.

The Pew Global Attitudes survey released in June 2010 also noted the significant partisan difference, finding that nearly two-thirds, a 65% majority, of Republicans wanted to continue to keep the military forces in Afghanistan indefinitely, while 36% of Democrats supported this.

The ABC News / Washington Post poll conducted June 3–6, 2010 similarly reported that the majority 62% of Republicans think the almost-nine-year war imposed on that country has been worth its costs to the U.S., while the majority two-thirds, 66%, of Democrats and 53% of independents think it has not been worth fighting. In fact, the majority 54% of Democratic-leaning Americans "strongly" think that the war has not been worth fighting.

The CBS News poll conducted July 9–12, 2010 also reported the strong partisan divide over the war. The 73% majority of Democrats want a timetable set for withdrawal, while the majority 66% of Republicans do not. The nearly-three-quarters majority, 74%, of Democrats want most U.S. troops to be withdrawn within a year or two, while a majority 52% of Republicans want them to stay longer than another two years.

The CNN / Opinion Research poll conducted October 5–7, 2010 reported that 68% of Democrats oppose the war, while, on the other hand, the majority 51% of Republicans favor the war, the only group of respondents to do so. 28% of Democrats support the war. Among Independents, the majority 61% oppose the war, while 35% support it.

The ABC News / Washington Post poll conducted December 9–12, 2010 continued to find that Republicans remained the most supportive of warfare in Afghanistan: albeit down 35% from the peak in 2007, 50% of Republicans still say the war has been worth fighting in that country. Among Democrats 36% think the war has been worth fighting.

In the CNN / Opinion Research poll conducted December 17–19, 2010, the three-quarters majority of Democratic voters oppose the war, as do more than six in ten independent voters, while, on the other hand, 52% of Republicans, and 52% of Tea Party supporters, supported continuation of the war.

The Washington Post / ABC News poll conducted March 10–13, 2011 reported that 19% of Democratic voters think the war is worth fighting – compared to half of Republican supporters, the chief constituency supporting the war. The majority two-thirds of independent voters think the war is not worth fighting, while about one-in-four think it is. 80% of independent voters want Barack Obama to withdraw a "substantial number" of troops from Afghanistan "this summer".

In the USA Today / Gallup poll conducted May 5–8, 2011, a week following the killing of Osama bin Laden, Democratic and independent voters, by a 2-to-1 margin, believe the U.S. has finished its work and should now bring its troops home. The majority two-thirds of Democratic voters, 66%, think that U.S. troops should now be brought home, as do the majority 62% of independent voters. Among Republican voters, an equal number, 47%, think that the American troops should be brought home, and 47% do not. Not a single major demographic group had a majority that favored keeping U.S. military forces in Afghanistan.

In the Gallup poll conducted June 25–26, 2011, the majority of Democratic and independent voters favor the announced withdrawal of all U.S. troops by 2014. 87% of Democratic voters and 74% of independent voters favor the planned withdrawal, with 11% and 21% opposed. 50% of Republican voters also favor the announced withdrawal, while 43% opposed it. In the same poll 54% of Republicans thought a timetable should not be set.

In the CBS News / New York Times poll conducted June 24–28, 2011, the majority 60% of Democratic voters and 63% of independent voters oppose their country's military involvement, while 32% and 28%, respectively, support it. 90% of Democratic voters and 79% of independent voters approved of the plan to withdraw all U.S. troops by the end of 2014. 94% of Democratic voters and 84% of independent voters want at least one-third of U.S. troops withdrawn within a year, by the end of summer 2012. On the other hand, Republican voters were split, with 48% opposed to the U.S. military involvement and 47% supporting it. 67% of Republican voters approve of President Obama's plan to withdraw all U.S. troops by the end of 2014, and 75% want at least one-third of the troops withdrawn within a year, by the end of summer 2012.

In the Pew Research Center poll released at the 10th anniversary of the U.S. invasion of Afghanistan and the longest period of sustained warfare in its history, the majority 59% of Democratic voters and the majority 58% of independent voters think the war has not been worth fighting, while 34% and 36%, respectively, think it has. On the other hand, the majority 56% of Republicans think the decade-long war has been worth fighting, while 37% think it has not.

=== Increasing opposition to the war among conservatives ===
In a January 2011 poll of conservatives, 66% of self-identified conservative voters and Tea Party supporters call for either a reduction of U.S. troop levels (the 39% plurality) or a complete withdrawal "as soon as possible" (27%). 24% think that the current levels of troops should be maintained. The majority 71% of conservative voters, including over two-thirds of Tea Party supporters, are worried that the war's cost to American taxpayers – $120 billion spent on the war in 2010 – will make it more difficult to reduce the U.S. deficit next year and balance the U.S. federal budget in the next decade. The poll for the Afghanistan Study Group was conducted January 4–10, 2011.

A USA Today / Gallup poll conducted January 14–16, 2011 also reported that, behind an 86% of Democrats and 72% of independents, there was now also 61% of self-identified conservatives calling for an accelerated withdrawal of U.S. troops.

In the Gallup poll conducted June 25–26, 2011, 50% of Republican voters generally favor the announced withdrawal of all U.S. troops from Afghanistan by 2014, while 43% opposed it.

In the CBS News / New York Times poll conducted June 24–28, 2011, 67% of Republican voters approve of the plan to withdraw all U.S. troops by the end of summer 2012, and 75% of Republican voters want at least one-third of U.S. troops withdrawn by the end of summer 2012: the plurality 41% of Republican voters want more than one-third of U.S. troops withdrawn in this timeframe, 34% want about a third, while 18% thought it should be less than one-third.

== Opinions of the public in ANZUS and NATO allies of the U.S. ==
=== 2008 ===
In the Pew Global Attitudes survey conducted in 2008, the majority of respondents in five of the six NATO partners expressed a desire for an early troop withdrawal, and not one of the six showed majority support for maintaining troops in Afghanistan. In 2009, not one of the seven NATO allies in the Pew Global Attitudes survey had majority support for continuing to keep military forces there, but all seven of the NATO allies in the survey had majority or strong plurality opposition to sending more troops.

=== 2009 ===
Level of support for sending more troops to Afghanistan
NATO member	% Support 2009	% Support 2010	% Support 2011
United States	30%	25%	6%
United Kingdom	11%	7%	3%
France	4%	4%	2%
Germany	7%	7%	4%
Italy	6%	4%	2%
Netherlands	4%	4%	5%
Poland	5%	2%	2%
Portugal	4%	2%	3%
Spain	7%	6%	3%
Slovakia	2%	3%	2%
Bulgaria	2%	2%	1%
Romania	5%	6%	2%
Turkey	14%	16%	12%

The June 2009 "Transatlantic Trends" survey of 13 NATO countries, also from an American policy think tank, the German Marshall Fund of the United States, further underlined the publics' opposition to the war in NATO countries involved with the U.S. in Afghanistan.

The majorities of the populations of all 12 of the NATO nations surveyed in Europe and Turkey want their military forces in Afghanistan to be reduced or completely withdrawn – United Kingdom (60%), France (51%), Germany (57%), Italy (55%), Netherlands (50%), Poland (68%), Portugal (52%), Spain (54%), Slovakia (61%), Bulgaria (72%), Romania (61%), Turkey (50%).

The majority 55% of West Europeans and the majority 69% of East Europeans want to reduce or remove their troops from Afghanistan, with complete troop removal called for by 51% of Poles, 50% of Bulgarians, 48% of Romanians, 41% of Britons, and 41% of Germans.

Despite pressure from the Obama administration to increase their troop levels in Afghanistan, the public is strongly opposed in all 12 of the NATO ally countries surveyed. 77% of people, in the 12 NATO countries surveyed in the Europe Union and Turkey oppose sending more troops to Afghanistan. Fewer than 1 in 5 people, 19%, in the 12 NATO countries supported sending more troops.

(Source: German Marshall Fund of the United States – Transatlantic Trends June 2009, 2010, and 2011 surveys)

The poll of the NATO countries, conducted in June 2009, about 2 months before the Afghan election, also reported that 56% of Americans were optimistic about stabilizing the situation in Afghanistan, whereas the majority 62% of people in the 12 NATO countries in Europe and Turkey were not.

In the 2009 Pew Global Attitudes Project survey, none of the seven NATO allies surveyed had majority support for keeping NATO troops in Afghanistan. Despite repeated American calls for their NATO allies to send more troops to Afghanistan, there was majority or plurality opposition to such action in all seven of the NATO ally countries surveyed: Germany (63% disapprove), France (62%), Poland (57%), Canada (55%), Britain (51%), Spain (50%), and Turkey (49%).

=== 2010 ===
In 2010, none of the six NATO allies in the Pew Global Attitudes survey had majority support for keeping troops in Afghanistan. The survey found instead that the majorities and pluralities of the public in 5 out of 6 NATO member countries want the NATO military forces to be removed from Afghanistan "as soon as possible". A 67% majority in Turkey, 58% majority in Germany, 52% majority in France, 49% plurality in Spain, 44% plurality in Poland, and 45% in the United Kingdom all want the NATO military forces to be removed from Afghanistan "as soon as possible".

The Transatlantic Trends June 2010 study by the German Marshall Fund of the United States found that pluralities all of the 12 NATO ally countries surveyed, and majorities in 11 out of 12 of them, want to withdraw all or some of their troops from Afghanistan.

For the 12 European NATO countries surveyed as a whole, 70% think their country should begin to withdraw troops immediately (36%) or in 2011 if conditions permit (36%). 23% think their troops should stay as long as it takes to "stabilize" Afghanistan. The majority 62% of the European NATO populations surveyed want a complete withdrawal of all of their troops (the 43% plurality) or a reduction of troops (19%). 28% would keep the troop numbers at their current levels. 6% would agree to send more troops to Afghanistan.

=== 2011 ===
The Transatlantic Trends June 2011 study by the German Marshall Fund of the United States found that majorities in the United States (66%) and in all 11 European NATO member countries surveyed – the United Kingdom (69%), Germany (70%), France (64%), Italy (65%), Poland (73%), Portugal (58%), Spain (57%), Netherlands (55%), Romania (67%), Bulgaria (63%), and Slovakia (64%) – want all or some troops withdrawn from Afghanistan. For all 11 European NATO countries taken as a whole, the majority 66% of Europeans in the NATO countries surveyed want all or some of their troops withdrawn from Afghanistan: the plurality 44% want all of their troops to be withdrawn from Afghanistan, another 22% want some of their troops to be withdrawn to reduce the number there. Less than one in three, 29%, support maintaining the current number of troops in Afghanistan, and 3% would support sending yet more troops.

In December 2010, the U.S. Secretary of Defense, Robert Gates, acknowledged the opposition of the public in almost all countries:

Public opinion would be … in terms of majority, against their participation [in the war].

=== 2014 ===
Marek Obrtel, former Lieutenant Colonel in Field Hospital with Czech Republic army, returned his medals which he received during his posting in Afghanistan War for NATO operations. He criticized the war on terror as describing the mission as "deeply ashamed that I served a criminal organization such as NATO, led by the USA and its perverse interests around the world."

== See also ==
- 2009 Afghan presidential election
- Bagram torture and prisoner abuse
- British forces casualties in Afghanistan
- Canadian Afghan detainee abuse scandal
- Canadian Forces casualties in Afghanistan
- Afghanistan conflict (1978–present)
- Civilian casualties in the war in Afghanistan (2001–2021)
- Coalition casualties in Afghanistan
- Criticism of the war on terrorism
- Foreign hostages in Afghanistan
- German Armed Forces casualties in Afghanistan
- Opposition to the War in Afghanistan (2001–2021)
- Protests against the invasion of Afghanistan
- War in Afghanistan (2001–2021)
