= Albert Davy =

New Zealand political organiser and campaign manager

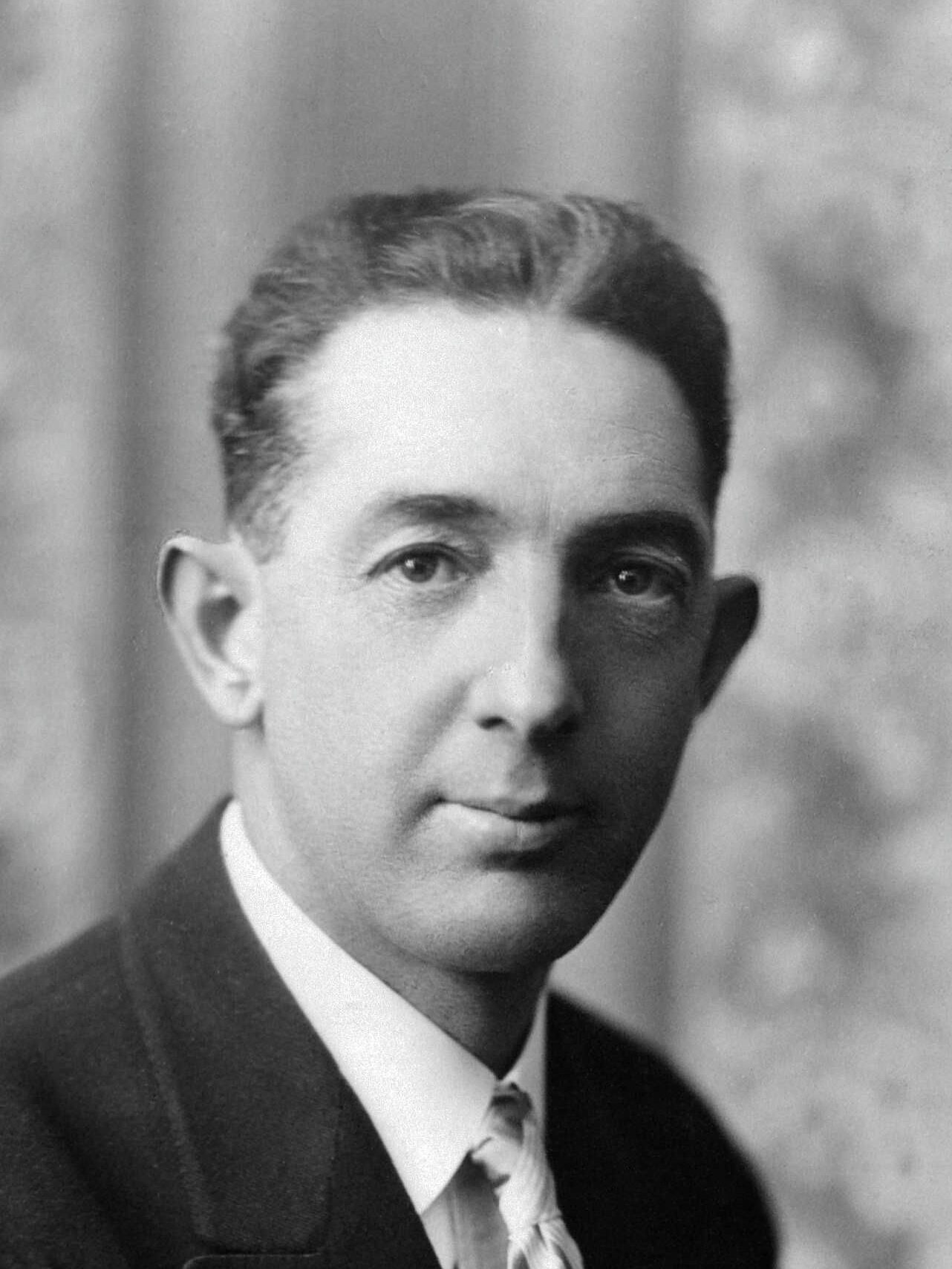
Davy in circa 1930s

Albert Ernest Davy (17 August 1886 – 13 June 1959) was a New Zealand political organiser and campaign manager; and at the height of his career, was regarded as one of the best in the country. He was a strong opponent of socialism, and spent most of his life fighting what he saw as socialist tendencies in New Zealand politics.

== Early life ==
Davy was born in Wellington, where his father Charles was a police officer. His great grandfather - Captain Lleyson Hopkin Davy emigrated out from Wales in 1841. His family moved around the country considerably during Davy's youth, eventually coming to live in Gisborne. Davy held a number of jobs there, including bootmaker, draper, and hairdresser. He married Florence Maude Sawyer, a milliner, in 1908. He was to have two sons. He was active in the New Zealand Auto Cycle Union and the New Zealand Athletic and Cycling Union, holding a number of prominent organisational roles.

== Reform Party ==
Davy's first major political activity came as part of Douglas Lysnar's successful campaign for the Gisborne seat in the 1919 election. In 1923, Davy was offered an organisational position in the Reform Party, to which Lynsar belonged. He was largely responsible for Reform's strategy in the 1925 election, focusing strongly on the party's leader, Gordon Coates. This was unusual in New Zealand politics, where the focus tended to be on local candidates. Also unusual was the degree of central control – party headquarters provided each candidate with instructions and guidance, rather than simply allowing them to run their own campaigns. While this is now the norm in New Zealand politics, it was rare at the time.

The elections were a major victory for Reform, and Davy gained much of the credit. He quickly developed a reputation as the country's top political organiser. Soon, however, rifts began to emerge between Davy and the Reform Party. As the country's economic situation worsened, the Reform Party began to adopt more radical measures to address the problem – Davy condemned the measures as "socialistic". He also made enemies by allegedly blocking Ellen Melville, who sought the Reform Party candidacy for an Auckland by-election – when Melville lost, she contested the seat as an independent, and split the vote. In late 1926, Davy left the Reform Party, possibly under pressure. He denounced its leadership as "autocratic".

== United Party ==
In the middle of 1927, Davy was contacted by John William Shaw McArthur, an Auckland businessman who shared Davy's view of the government. With financial backing from McArthur, Davy began to lay the foundations of a new political party, eventually dubbed the United New Zealand Political Organisation. He was assisted by the fact that he still retained membership and contact lists from the Reform Party, enabling him to draw away Reform supporters who were sympathetic to his cause. In November 1927 Davy's organisation merged with the National Party (formerly called the Liberal Party until 1925) led by George Forbes, and then in 1928 it was joined by Bill Veitch the leader of another newly formed Liberal movement (consisting only of Veitch in parliament). In parliament the National Party was renamed the United Party. When a leadership clash between Forbes and Veitch loomed, Davy arranged for Joseph Ward, a former Liberal premier, to take the position as a compromise candidate.

In the 1925 election, Davy ran a strong campaign for the United Party. The party performed well, managing to win the same number of seats as the Reform Party. However, neither United nor Reform had enough strength to govern alone – the Labour Party held the balance of power. United managed to secure Labour's support, and formed a government, but Davy was displeased at this development – far from fighting the left-wingers, United was now dependent on their support, and was implementing many of the same policies that had caused Davy to quit Reform. Davy came to believe that as long as United and Reform remained enemies, the left would hold the balance of power, and would therefore be able to dictate terms. As such, Davy began to advocate an "anti-socialist" grand coalition between United and Reform, hoping to shut the left out altogether. In early 1930, Davy publicly attacked Ward, accusing him of authoritarianism and of caving in to Labour's demands too readily. Shortly afterwards, he was dismissed from the party.

== Reform Party again ==
Later in 1930, Davy rejoined the Reform Party, believing that United had become corrupted by its alliance with Labour. Shortly afterwards, the agreement between United and Labour collapsed, and United and Reform agreed to the grand coalition that Davy had proposed. Despite the new alliance, however, the government did not significantly back away from its existing approach to the country's economic problems. As such, Davy was still not fully behind the government, and he gave assistance to John Ormond, an independent candidate who wished to "reform the Reform Party". However, Davy did not follow Ormond and his allies when later broke from the Reform Party, founding an organisation would evolve into the New Zealand Legion.

== Other parties ==
In 1934, Davy was approached by another Auckland businessman, William Goodfellow. Goodfellow agreed to finance another new party, dedicated to opposing the government's "socialism". The group was named the Democrat Party, and Thomas Hislop, a former Mayor of Wellington, was recruited to be its political leader. Goodfellow later withdrew from the party, saying the Davy's goals were unrealistic and that resources were being spread too finely, but Davy pressed on. In the 1935 election, however, the Democrats failed to win any seats. According to some, the party merely succeeded in splitting the right-wing vote, assisting the Labour Party in its landslide victory.

Davy then briefly left politics, working as a sharebroker and newspaper manager. In 1940, he returned to politics, joining the People's Movement.

In February 1941 part of the People's Movement merged into the National Party (the ultimate conclusion of the United-Reform coalition), and Davy established his own Co-operative Party, but he soon abandoned this and returned to the remnants of the Movement. The later People's Movement or Independent Peoples Group (IPG) organised by Davy stood 25 candidates in the 1943 election without success, gaining only 7,389 votes (0.89%, provisional count). Davy complained that the election was decided on "strictly party" lines, and said that the effect of the Democratic Labour Party standing was to give six seats to the National Party.

== Later life ==
Finally giving up on politics, Davy returned to business. He also served on the Trade Practices and Prices Commission. He died in Wellington on 13 June 1959.
