= People's Movement (New Zealand) =

The People's Movement was a political party in New Zealand. It was active in the late 1930s and early 1940s, and was individualist in outlook. It campaigned for a reduction in the size of government, a reform of the civil service, a limit on the powers of political parties, and an end to the governing Labour Party's "socialist" policies.

Although the Movement had a relatively high political profile, it did not achieve any notable successes. In April 1940, the Movement was joined by Albert Davy, an astute political organiser who had been credited with successful campaigns for the United Party and the Reform Party. However his Democrat Party formed in 1934 only split the conservative vote in the 1935 election and the 1938 election, and aided the 1935 Labour landslide.

Again, Davy and the People's Movement failed to make much impact. In February 1941, a faction of the Movement merged into the National Party, and in 1942, Davy branched off to found the New Zealand Co-operative Party.

In the 1943 elections, the remnants of the People's Movement (organised by Davy) sponsored 25 candidates under the name of the "Independent Group" or "Independent People's Group" (IPG), but the candidates got only 7,389 votes (0.89%; provisional vote count) and none were elected. Davy complained that the 1943 election was decided on "strictly party" lines, and said that the effect of the Democratic Labour Party standing was to give six seats to the National Party.
