= Center for International Policy =

American foreign policy research institute (founded 1975)

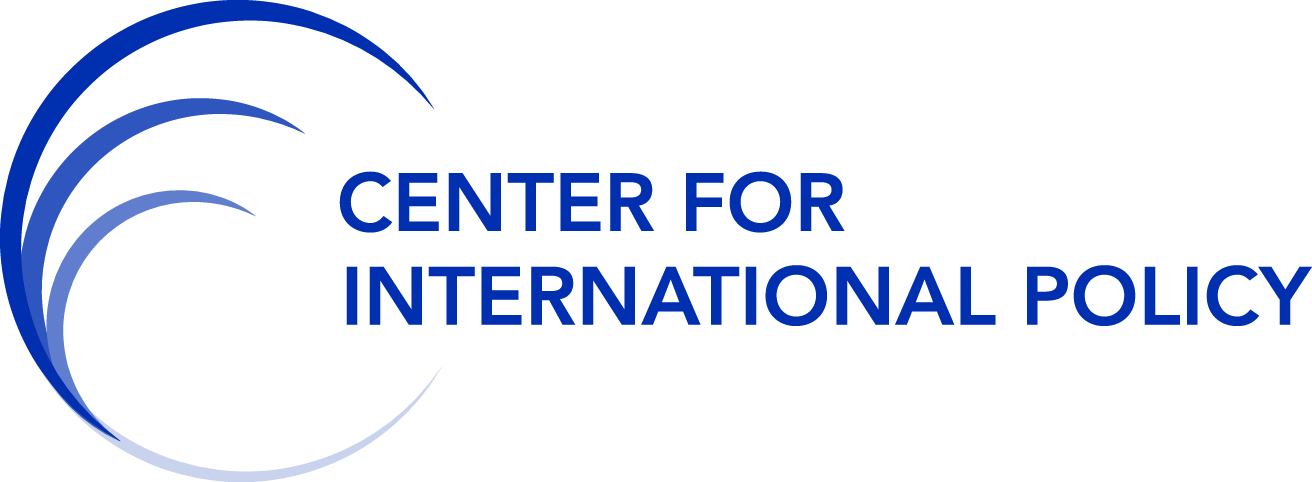
- Center for International Policy Logo
- Abbreviation: CIP
- Formation: 1975
- Type: Policy Organization
- Headquarters: 2000 M Street NW, Suite 720
- Location: Washington, D.C., United States
- President & CEO: Nancy Okail
- Budget: Revenue: $6,219,788; Expenses: $5,745,375 (Fiscal year 2019)
- Website: internationalpolicy.org

The Center for International Policy (CIP) is a non-profit foreign policy research and advocacy think tank with offices in Washington, D.C., and New York City. It was founded in 1975 in response to the Vietnam War. The Center describes its mission as promoting "cooperation, transparency and accountability in global relations".

The center is the parent organization for a variety of projects, including the Security Assistance Monitor, the Arms & Security Project, and the Foreign Influence Transparency Initiative. It also has collaborated with the Washington Office on Latin America and the Latin America Working Group to publish the Just the Facts website. The center is currently the fiscal sponsor of the environmental protection organization, Mighty Earth, and Freedom Forward. Several prominent individuals serve as senior fellows and board members with CIP, including former Costa Rican president Óscar Arias Sánchez, UN ambassador Dessima Williams, Michael Barnes, and Matthew Hoh.

== History ==
=== 1970s ===
The center was founded in 1975 under the fiscal sponsorship of the Fund for Peace by activists, including Bill Goodfellow and then-retired US foreign service official Donald Ranard, who served as the center's first executive director.

During its first years, the Center focused its work on Asia, especially United States foreign policy towards South Korea and its relationships with the Park Chung Hee-led government. In 1976, Ranard testified to Congress on human rights violations in South Korea and the role of South Korean lobbyists in Washington. In 1978, the center established an Indochina Program, which advocated the normalization of diplomatic relations with Vietnam, Laos, and Cambodia; the program was closed 11 years later in 1989.

In the mid-1970s, while at the time also co-chairs of the center's Board, US Representatives Donald Fraser and Tom Harkin introduced legislation that incorporated foreign countries' human rights records into consideration of security and economic aid.

=== 1980s ===
During the 1980s, CIP campaigned in support of the Contadora Group and the subsequent Esquipulas Peace Agreement.

After South Africa received a loan from the International Monetary Fund in 1983, the center began a campaign that pushed for provisions that prohibited the US representative to the IMF to support loans to countries that practice apartheid. The Center continued its work with research into labor practices and economic impacts of apartheid in South Africa.

=== 1990s ===
In 1990, the center established a joint program with the Costa Rica–based Arias Foundation, founded by Óscar Arias. The organisation's new president, Robert White, also worked extensively with Haitian President Jean-Bertrand Aristide during his exile in Washington in the 1990s.

Wayne Smith joined the Center in 1991 to establish its Cuba program, working towards the normalisation of relations between the United States and Cuba.

In the mid-1990s, Adam Isacson established the Latin American Security program, which still operates today. The program campaigned against the militarisation of Plan Colombia and supporting the movement of funds to programs for judicial reforms and economic development. In June 1999, the program led the first ever congressional delegation to meet with insurgent leaders inside the territory they controlled.

=== 2000s ===
Clarissa Segun and Paul Olweny, leaders for the Demilitarization for Democracy project, joined the Center in 2000. The project campaigned for diplomatic aid and United Nations peacekeeping. The project eventually closed in 2006.

Sarah Stephens worked on Cuba policy, joining the Center in 2001 with the Freedom to Travel project. She left CIP in 2006 and then launched the Center for Democracy in the Americas (CDA).

In 2003, then-President Robert White established a program focused on governmental corruption in Central America, specifically illegal logging in Honduras. Former The Washington Post foreign correspondent Selig Harrison joined CIP in the same year to head the center's Asia program which focused on North Korea and the Indian subcontinent.

With the publishing of his book Capitalism's Achilles Heel: Dirty Money and How to Renew the Free-Market System (Wiley & Sons, 2005), CIP senior fellow Raymond Baker founds Global Financial Integrity (GFI), a non-profit, research and advocacy organisation focused on the role of illicit financial flows.

In June 2007, the Americas Program joined CIP after the dissolution of the International Relations Center. The Americas Program continues as the TransBorder Project and the Americas Project today.

== Current programs ==
The center currently operates nine programs including the Arms & Security Project, Security Assistance Monitor, and the Foreign Influence Transparency Initiative among others. In its capacity, the center also fiscally sponsors the environmental protection organization, Mighty Earth, and Freedom Forward.

=== Security Assistance Monitor ===
Led by director Christina Arabia, Security Assistance Monitor (SAM) tracks and analyzes U.S. security and defense assistance programs worldwide. By informing policymakers, media, scholars, NGOs and the public in the United States and abroad about trends and issues related to U.S. foreign security assistance, their aim is to enhance transparency and promote greater oversight of U.S. military and police aid, arms sales and training.

The SAM database compiles all publicly available data on U.S. foreign security assistance programs worldwide from 2000 to the present. Collected from a wide range of government documents, the database provides detailed numbers on U.S. arms sales, military and police aid and training programs. Users can search these numbers by country, region, program and assistance type.

=== Arms and Security Project ===
The Arms and Security Project engages in media outreach and public education aimed at promoting reforms in U.S. policies on nuclear weapons, military spending and the arms trade. It seeks to advance the notion that diplomacy and international cooperation are the most effective tools for protecting the United States. According to program director William D. Hartung, "the use of military force is largely irrelevant in addressing the greatest dangers we face, from terrorism, to nuclear proliferation, to epidemics of disease, to climate change, to inequities of wealth and income. The allocation of budgetary resources needs to be changed to reflect this reality."

Hartung's research is most frequently sited in publications such as the Hill, Defense News, the Washington Post among others.

=== Foreign Influence Transparency Initiative ===
The Foreign Influence Transparency Initiative (FITI) "believes that promoting transparency is the best tool for highlighting the impact – potentially for both good and ill – of foreign influence on American democracy." Directed by Ben Freeman, the program "works to devise policy solutions to increase the incentives for agents to properly register and report the work they are doing on behalf of foreign powers and to make the details of such contracts and work publicly available." Most recently, FITI is heavily critical of the Pentagon budget and the Saudi Arabian lobby in Washington.

=== Sustainable Defense Task Force ===
The Sustainable Defense Task Force (SDTF) is a "bipartisan group of experts from academia, think tanks, government, and retired members of the military". CIP launched the Sustainable Defense Task Force (SDTF) in November 2018 to strategize a 10-year budget plan for the Pentagon. In June 2019, the task force published a report stating the Pentagon could save $1.2 trillion in projected spending over the next decade "while providing a greater measure of security". The report was featured in The Hill, the Washington Post, Defense News, and other news sources.

=== List ===
- Security Assistance Monitor
- Arms & Security Project
- Foreign Influence Transparency Initiative
- Sustainable Defense Task Force
- Cuba Project
- Americas Program
- Africa Program
- Mighty Earth (fiscally sponsored)
- Freedom Forward (fiscally sponsored)
- Win Without War
