= Selig S. Harrison =

American foreign policy scholar and journalist

- Born: Selig Seidenman Harrison; March 19, 1927; Wilkinsburg, Pennsylvania, U.S.
- Died: December 30, 2016 (aged 89); Camden, Maine, U.S.
- Occupations: scholar, journalist, author

Selig Seidenman Harrison (March 19, 1927 – December 30, 2016) was a scholar and journalist, who specialized in South Asia and East Asia. He was the Director of the Asia Program and a senior fellow at the Center for International Policy, and a senior scholar of the Woodrow Wilson International Center for Scholars. He was also a member of the Afghanistan Study Group. He wrote five books on Asian affairs and U.S. relations with Asia. His last book, Korean Endgame: A Strategy for Reunification and U.S. Disengagement (Princeton University Press), won the 2002 award of the Association of American Publishers for the best Professional/Scholarly Book in Government and Political Science.

His outspoken, constructive criticisms of administration policies often appeared on op-ed pages of many major newspapers, including The Washington Post, The New York Times, the International Herald Tribune, The Los Angeles Times, and The Financial Times.

== Career ==
Harrison graduated from Harvard University (B.A., 1948). Several articles credited to his name were published in The Harvard Crimson between 1945 and 1949. Harrison served as South Asia Correspondent of the Associated Press from 1951 to 1954, in New Delhi, returned as South Asia Bureau Chief of The Washington Post from 1962 to 1965, and served as Northeast Asia Bureau Chief of the Post, based in Tokyo, from 1968 to 1972. From 1974 to 1996, as a senior associate of the Carnegie Endowment for International Peace, he pursued investigative assignments every year in a variety of countries, especially those where he worked as a journalist, such as India, Pakistan, China, Japan, and the two Koreas. During the late 1970s Harrison conducted field research on the Baluch insurgency and Pashtun nationalism.

Harrison worked as managing editor of The New Republic, served as senior fellow in charge of Asian studies at the Brookings Institution, and as a senior fellow at the East–West Center. Harrison was a professorial lecturer in Asian studies at the Johns Hopkins University School of Advanced International Studies, and an adjunct professor of Asian studies at the Elliott School of International Affairs, George Washington University. Harrison was frequently invited to testify as an expert witness before congressional committees and lectured at the National Defense University, the National War College and the State Department's Foreign Service Institute. He appeared on The News Hour with Jim Lehrer, Nightline, Morning Edition, and Talk of the Nation.

== North Korea ==
Harrison visited North Korea eleven times, the last time being in January 2009.

In the last week of May 1972, Harrison, representing The Washington Post, and Harrison Salisbury of the New York Times became the first Americans to visit North Korea since the Korean War and to interview Kim Il Sung. Following his second visit to Pyongyang in 1987, Harrison presided over a 1989 Carnegie Endowment symposium that brought together North Korean spokesmen and American specialists and officials for the first time and has reported on this meeting in his Endowment study, Dialogue with North Korea. In 1992, he led a Carnegie Endowment delegation to Pyongyang that learned for the first time that North Korea had reprocessed plutonium.

On June 9, 1994, on his fourth visit, he met Kim Il Sung for three hours and won an agreement to the concept of a freeze and eventual dismantlement of the North Korean nuclear program in exchange for U.S. political and economic concessions. President Jimmy Carter, meeting Kim Il Sung a week later, persuaded the North Korean leader to initiate the freeze immediately. This opened the way for negotiations with the U.S. that resulted in the Agreed Framework between the United States of America and the Democratic People's Republic of Korea of October 21, 1994.

Harrison favored handling North Korea through diplomacy and advocated normalizing relations, saying "we have got to get into diplomacy, and not go into naval exercises" to resolve tensions on the peninsula, and writing elsewhere that "the United States should move as quickly as possible to normalize relations. Normalization would speed up the denuclearization process." Harrison was especially critical of "hard-liners" in the Bush administration during the Sunshine Policy era. During the fifth round of the Six-party talks Harrison branded the officials David Addington, J.W. Crouch and Robert Joseph as an "Axis of Evil" within the administration, accusing them of undermining negotiations with North Korea and orchestrating "a campaign to depict North Korea as a “criminal regime” with which normalized relations are not possible." More recently Harrison also characterized South Korean President Lee Myung-bak as a "hard-liner", who had "invited retaliation" from North Korea by reversing the policies of his Sunshine-era predecessors.

== Reputation ==
Harrison's reputation for giving "early warning" of foreign policy crises was well established during his career as a foreign correspondent. In his study of foreign reporting, Between Two Worlds, John Hohenberg, former secretary of the Pulitzer Prize Board, cited Harrison's prediction of the 1965 Indo-Pakistan War 18 months before it happened. Hohenberg wrote: "What Harrison foresaw came to pass, and when it happened, American editors suddenly rose up in their wrath – as they always do at such times – and demanded, 'why weren't we told about all of this?' They had been told at great length, but because too many editors were bored with a place like India, they weren't listening." Terming Harrison "one of the few correspondents in all of Asia who was able to maintain a balanced point of view," Hohenberg called him a model of the "first-rate correspondent who knows the past of the area to which he is assigned, writes with clarity and meaning of the present and has an awareness of the future."

More than a year before the Russians invaded Afghanistan, Harrison warned of this possibility in one of his frequent contributions to the influential journal, Foreign Policy. During the Soviet occupation of Afghanistan, he was one of the earliest to foresee that the Soviet Union would withdraw its forces and become a leading advocate of a two-track policy designed to promote a withdrawal through a combination of military pressure and diplomatic incentives. He was also one of the few who predicted that the Kabul Communist regime would not fall immediately after the withdrawal. Rep. Stephen Solarz, chairman of the House Subcommittee on East Asian and Pacific Affairs, introducing him at a hearing on February 21, 1989, one year after the withdrawal, observed that "with each passing day his reputation as a prophet is enhanced. I am sure it wasn't easy for Mr. Harrison, in the face of a phalanx of analysts, academicians, and others who were all saying the opposite, to maintain his position, but he had the intellectual fortitude and moral strength to stick by his guns, his analytical guns, and I think he deserves credit for that."

Some of Harrison's writings on North Korea have been challenged by other voices in the media. B.R. Myers doubted Harrison's assertion that, based on discussions with North Korean officials, there is a long-running "hawks vs. doves" split within its ranks, stating that "there may well be differences of opinion inside the military-first regime, but they almost certainly do not rise to the level of a hawk-dove split, and even if they did, they would never be divulged to outsiders." In the wake of the inter-Korean tensions that followed the North Korean shelling of the South Korean island of Yeonpyeong in November 2010, Harrison proposed that the United States solve the crisis by redrawing the Northern Limit Line southward to a position more favorable to North Korea, with South Korea allowed no veto in the matter. Harrison's editorial was roundly criticized in the pages of the major South Korean newspaper The Chosun Ilbo, and characterized as "simplistic and inaccurate" in The Korea Herald.

== Personal life ==
Selig S. Harrison was married and had two children and four grandchildren.

== Death ==
Harrison died at age 89 from a blood disorder in Camden, Maine on December 30, 2016.

== Works ==
=== Books authored by Harrison alone ===
- Korean Endgame: A Strategy for Reunification and U.S. Disengagement (Princeton, 2002)
- In Afghanistan’s Shadow (Carnegie Endowment, 1981)
- The Widening Gulf: Asian Nationalism and American Policy (The Free Press, 1978)
- China, Oil, and Asia: Conflict Ahead? (Columbia, 1977)
- India: The Most Dangerous Decades (Princeton, 1960)

=== Books co-authored or edited ===
- co-editor of India and the United States (Macmillan, 1960)
- co-author with K. Subrahmanyam of Superpower Rivalry in the Indian Ocean: Indian and American Perspectives (Oxford University Press, 1989)
- co-author with Anthony Lake, After the Wars: Reconstruction in Afghanistan, Indochina, Central America, Southern Africa, and the Horn of Africa,(Transaction Publishers, 1990)
- co-author with Diego Cordovez of Out of Afghanistan: The Inside Story of the Soviet Withdrawal (Oxford, 1995)
- co-editor with Masashi Nishihara, U. N. Peacekeeping: Japanese and American Perspectives, (Carnegie Endowment for International Peace, 1995)
- editor of Japan's Nuclear Future: The Plutonium Debate and East Asian Security (Carnegie Endowment for International Peace, 1996)
- co-author with Leonard Spector, Nuclear Weapons and the Security of Korea, (Brookings Institution Press, 1997)
- co-editor with Paul H. Kreisberg, Dennis Kux & Lee Hamilton, India and Pakistan:The First Fifty Years (Woodrow Wilson Center Press), 1998)
- co-editor with Clyde V. Prestowitz of "Miracle": Redefining U.S. Economic and Security Principles (Economic Strategy Institute, 1999)
- Pakistan: State of the Union (Center for International Policy, 2009)
