= Win Without War =

Anti-war coalition based in the US

- Founded: 2002
- Type: Non-profit; NGO
- Headquarters: Washington, D.C.
- Location: Global
- Fields: Media attention, public awareness campaigns, lobbying
- Website: www.winwithoutwar.org

Win Without War is a public education and advocacy coalition based in Washington, D.C. Founded in 2002 in the runup to the Iraq War, Win Without War remains active as a coalition of national, multi-issue organizations dedicated to advancing progressive national security solutions. The coalition comprises 37 national organizations including MoveOn.org, CREDO Action, the Council for a Livable World, and the NAACP. Win Without War is a program of the Center for International Policy.

== History ==
Win Without War was founded in 2002 in opposition to the impending American invasion of Iraq. Original coalition members included the National Council of Churches, Business Leaders for Sensible Priorities, the Conference of Major Superiors of Men, the Leadership Conference of Women Religious, Move On, the National Organization for Women, Physicians for Social Responsibility, Rainbow/PUSH, Sojourners, Women's Action for New Directions, and Working Assets. Its founding co-chairs were former Congressman and general secretary of the National Council of Churches Bob Edgar, and former executive director of Women’s Action for New Directions Susan Shaer. Edgar was later replaced as co-chair by David Cortright, Director of Policy Studies at the Kroc Institute for International Peace Studies at the University of Notre Dame.

The original goal of the coalition was to oppose a preemptive war in Iraq while still allowing for weapons inspections and monitoring to prevent Iraq from obtaining weapons of mass destruction. In a launch press conference, coalition co-chair Bob Edgar noted that the group believed that preemptive war with Iraq would be detrimental to America, noting: "We believe that a preemptive military invasion of Iraq will harm American national interests. Unprovoked war will increase human suffering, arouse animosity toward our country, increase the likelihood of terrorist attacks, damage the economy and undermine our moral standing in the world. It will make us less, not more, secure."

The coalition was previously run by former US Representative Thomas Andrews (D-ME), and its current director is Stephen Miles.

== Issues ==
Since the invasion of Iraq Win Without War has continued to advocate against US military intervention abroad and has developed campaigns around the core issues of reducing American militarism and upholding and protecting the rule of law in national security and foreign policy. Related issues have included the closing of the Guantanamo Bay detention center and the reduction of wasteful US military spending.

Opposition to US use of force in Syria

In 2014 Win Without War opposed the US military intervention on the Syrian Civil War on the grounds that it would be ineffective and cause civilian suffering. The coalition crafted a plan for alternatives to bombing to end the conflict in Syria. This plan called for financial sanctions, the disruption of supply lines, the addressing of local grievances, and an increase in humanitarian assistance. Win Without War continues to oppose US military intervention in Syria while promoting a negotiated settlement that brings the quickest possible end to hostilities.

Support of the Iran Nuclear Deal

In 2015 Win Without War was a vocal public supporter of the Joint Comprehensive Plan of Action commonly known as the Iran nuclear deal. Coalition efforts helped generate more than 1.8 million petition signatures and more than 1 million emails to members of Congress in support of the deal. [9] On September 10, 2015 the US Senate voted to uphold the JCPOA clearing the way for implementation. The adoption of the plan was considered a major foreign policy victory both for President Obama and for the progressive movement.

Protest against the 2026 Minab school attack

On March 18, 2026, amidst the Iran war and US-Israel airstrikes against Iran, Win Without War organized a protest included the display of children backpacks on Capitol Hill in protest of an airstrike on an Minab elementary school that killed 160 children on February 28, 2026. Additionally, several Democrats in Congress attended the protest.

== See also ==
- Opposition to the Iraq War
- List of anti-war organizations
- Peace movement
