= Sylvia Wood =

President of the New Zealand National Party

Sylvia Wood is a New Zealand businesswoman, currently serving as President of the New Zealand National Party. She succeeded Peter Goodfellow in 2022.

Wood was raised in the South Island. She owns and runs a human resources consultancy. She joined the New Zealand National Party in 2014 and its board in 2021, being elected as its president on 7 August 2022.

Wood is a member of the Employment Law Institute and the Institute of Directors.

She currently lives in Auckland.

== See also ==
- New Zealand National Party
- Knowhow
