= William Goodfellow (executive) =

William Chester Goodfellow (born May 25, 1947) is the director of the Afghanistan Peace Campaign, a non-governmental organization that promotes a political process that leads to an inclusive government in Afghanistan that respects the rights of minorities and particularly women. He maintains the organization's website and works with American and Afghan colleagues to build public support for providing humanitarian and development aid to Afghanistan. Goodfellow has made numerous trips to Kabul to interview government officials, human rights activists, and academics.

Goodfellow was one of the founders of the Center for International Policy (CIP) in 1975 and served as executive director from 1985 to 2017. Goodfellow testified before congressional committees and published op-ed articles in major U.S. newspapers. During the late 1970s, Goodfellow and his colleagues at CIP successfully lobbied for legislation that requires the executive branch to consider a country’s human rights record before providing economic and military aid.(1)

In the 1980s, Goodfellow promoted negotiations to end the civil wars in Nicaragua and El Salvador. He worked closely with Costa Rican President Oscar Arias and championed the Esquipulas Peace Agreement in the United States. He attended every Central American summit meeting and spoke and published articles about the peace process, which silenced the guns in Central America.(2)

Goodfellow directed Central for International Policy’s Common Defense Campaign to reduce U.S. military spending and change the way America relates to the rest of the world. He was co-chair of the Afghanistan Study Group (2009-2013), which brought together former senior government officials, academics and area specialists. In August 2010, the Afghanistan Study Group issued a report, A New Way Forward: Rethinking U.S. Strategy in Afghanistan that urged the Obama administration to seek a negotiated political settlement in Afghanistan.

From 1973 to 1975, Goodfellow was an associate at the Indochina Resource Center, a non-profit think tank staffed by academics and activists who produced scholarly research for the anti-Vietnam War movement. In January 1976, the last U.S ambassador to South Vietnam, Ambassador Graham Martin, went before the House International Relations Committee’s Special Subcommittee on Investigations to explain how the anti-war movement turned the American public against the Vietnam War. Ambassador Martin singled out the Indochina Resource Center, which he called, “an enormously effective organization and I do think that they deserve the compliment that I have paid them”.(3)

Goodfellow spent the last six months of the war in Indochina and was evacuated from both Cambodia and Vietnam in April 1975.

Goodfellow earned his undergraduate degree in political science from Boston University in 1970 and received his Masters from the Cambridge-Goddard Graduate School for Social Change in 1972. He has been married to Pulitzer Prize-winning Washington Post journalist Dana Priest since 1989.
