= Benjamin Goodfellow =

British solicitor (1864–1946)

Benjamin Goodfellow (12 January 1864 – 11 June 1946) was a British solicitor and philatelist who signed the Roll of Distinguished Philatelists in 1923.

Goodfellow was a specialist in the stamps of Persia, Prince Edward Island, New Zealand and Norway. He translated the work of Justus Anderssen on the stamps of Norway.
