= Peter Goodfellow (politician) =

New Zealand businessman and politician

President of the National Party
- In office 2 August 2009 – 6 August 2022
- Preceded by: Judy Kirk
- Succeeded by: Sylvia Wood

Personal details
- Born: 1953 (age 72–73) Auckland, New Zealand
- Party: National
- Spouse: Desley Simpson
- Relatives: Douglas Goodfellow (father); William Goodfellow (grandfather)
- Education: University of Auckland; University of California

Peter Goodfellow (born 1953) is a New Zealand businessman and former politician who served as the President of the New Zealand National Party from 2009 to 2022.

== Political career ==
Goodfellow was a long-time National Party activist. On 2 August 2009, he succeeded Judy Kirk as Party President. In 2009, Goodfellow faced early opposition from within the party, with reports that events instigating the breakup of his marriage had soured his relationship with the party directors. However, he was re-elected by the party's Board of Directors in July 2010. Goodfellow's presidency coincided with National's term in Government under prime ministers John Key and Bill English, as well as the beginning of National's time in Opposition under leaders Simon Bridges, Todd Muller, Judith Collins and Christopher Luxon.

In early August 2021, Goodfellow survived a leadership challenge by former Speaker of the New Zealand House of Representatives turned National Party board member David Carter. In response, Carter announced his resignation from the National Party's nine-member leadership board. In June 2022, Goodfellow announced he would not seek re-election to the presidency in August 2022 but intended to remain on the board. On announcing his retirement, Goodfellow stated that he had intended to step aside from the role in 2016, but John Key's resignation as prime minister convinced him to remain in the role.

== Business career ==
Peter Goodfellow is a director in fishing company Sanford Ltd. He is currently a Board Trustee on the St. Andrew's Village Trust (Inc).

== Personal life ==
He is the son of Douglas Goodfellow and grandson of Sir William Goodfellow. The wealth of the Goodfellow family was estimated at $500 million in 2013, largely acquired through investment in the dairy farming industry. He is married to Auckland councillor Desley Simpson.
