= New Zealand National Party =

Centre-right political party in New Zealand

New Zealand National Party Rōpū Nāhinara o Aotearoa
- President: Sylvia Wood
- Leader: Christopher Luxon
- Deputy Leader: Nicola Willis
- Founded: 14 May 1936; 90 years ago
- Preceded by: United–Reform Coalition
- Headquarters: 41 Pipitea Street, Thorndon, Wellington 6011
- Youth wing: Young Nationals
- LGBTQ wing: National with Pride
- Ideology: Conservatism; Liberalism
- Political position: Centre-right
- Regional affiliation: Asia Pacific Democracy Union
- European affiliation: European Conservatives and Reformists Party (regional partner, until 2022)
- International affiliation: International Democracy Union
- Colours: Blue
- Slogan: Fixing the Basics. Building the Future.
- House of Representatives: 48 / 123

Website
- national.org.nz

The New Zealand National Party (Māori: Rōpū Nāhinara o Aotearoa), often shortened to National (Nāhinara), or the Nats, is a centre-right political party in New Zealand that is the current senior governing party. It is one of two major parties that dominate contemporary New Zealand politics, alongside its traditional rival, the Labour Party.

National formed in 1936 through amalgamation of conservative and liberal parties, Reform and United respectively, and subsequently became New Zealand's second-oldest extant political party. National's predecessors had previously formed a coalition against the growing labour movement. National has governed for six periods during the 20th and 21st centuries, and has spent more time in government than any other political party in New Zealand.

After the 1949 general election, Sidney Holland became the first Prime Minister from the National Party, and remained in office until 1957. Keith Holyoake succeeded Holland, and was defeated months later at 1957 general election. Holyoake returned to office for a second period from 1960 to 1972. The party's platform shifted from moderate economic liberalism to increased emphasis on state interventionism during Robert Muldoon's National government from 1975 to 1984. In 1990, Jim Bolger formed another National government, which continued the radical free-market reforms initiated by the preceding Labour government. The party has since advocated free enterprise, reduction of taxes, and limited state regulation. Following the first MMP election in 1996, the National Party governed in a coalition with the populist New Zealand First Party. National Party leader Jenny Shipley became New Zealand's first female prime minister in 1997; her government was defeated by a Labour-led coalition in 1999.

The National Party was in government from 2008 to 2017 under John Key and Bill English; it governed with support from the centrist United Future, the classical-liberal ACT Party and the indigenous-rights-based Māori Party. At the 2017 general election, despite leaving government, the party secured 44.4% of the vote and won 56 seats, making it the largest caucus at the time in the House of Representatives. It lost this plurality position in the 2020 general election, receiving a significantly reduced vote share of 25.58% and 33 seats. National was again unable to form a government following the election and remained the Official Opposition.

Christopher Luxon has served as the Leader of the National Party since 30 November 2021. He led the party to victory in the 2023 general election, winning 38 percent of the party vote and a plurality with 48 seats. Subsequently, since November 2023, Luxon heads a National-led coalition government with the ACT Party and New Zealand First.

== History ==
=== Formation ===
The National Party was formed in May 1936, but its roots go considerably further back. The party came about as the result of a merger between the United Party (known as the Liberal Party until 1927, except for a short period between 1925 and 1927 when it used the name "National Party") and the Reform Party. The United Party gained its main support from the cities, and drew upon businesses for money and upon middle class electors for votes, while the Reform Party had a rural base and received substantial support from farmers, who then formed a substantial proportion of the population.

Liberal Party (1890)
Reform Party (1909)
United Party (1927)	Independents (1931)
United–Reform; coalition (1931)
National Party (1936)

Like other New Zealand political parties, the National Party is constituted by two separate entities. An unincorporated association of members operating outside of parliament under a written constitution, called "The New Zealand National Party", and a second unincorporated association of elected members of parliament, called the "Parliamentary National Party".

Historically, the Liberal and Reform parties had competed against each other; however, between 1931 and 1935, the United–Reform Coalition held power in New Zealand. The coalition went into the 1935 election under the title of the "National Political Federation", a name adopted to indicate that the grouping intended to represent New Zealanders from all backgrounds (in contrast to the previous situation, where United served city-dwellers and Reform served farmers). However, because of the effects of the Great Depression and a perception that the existing coalition government had handled the situation poorly, the National Political Federation lost heavily in 1935 to the Labour Party, the rise of which had prompted the alliance. The two parties were cut down to 19 seats between them.

Another factor was a third party, the Democrat Party formed by Albert Davy, a former organiser for the coalition who disapproved of the perceived "socialist" measures that the coalition had introduced. The new party split the conservative vote, and aided Labour's victory.

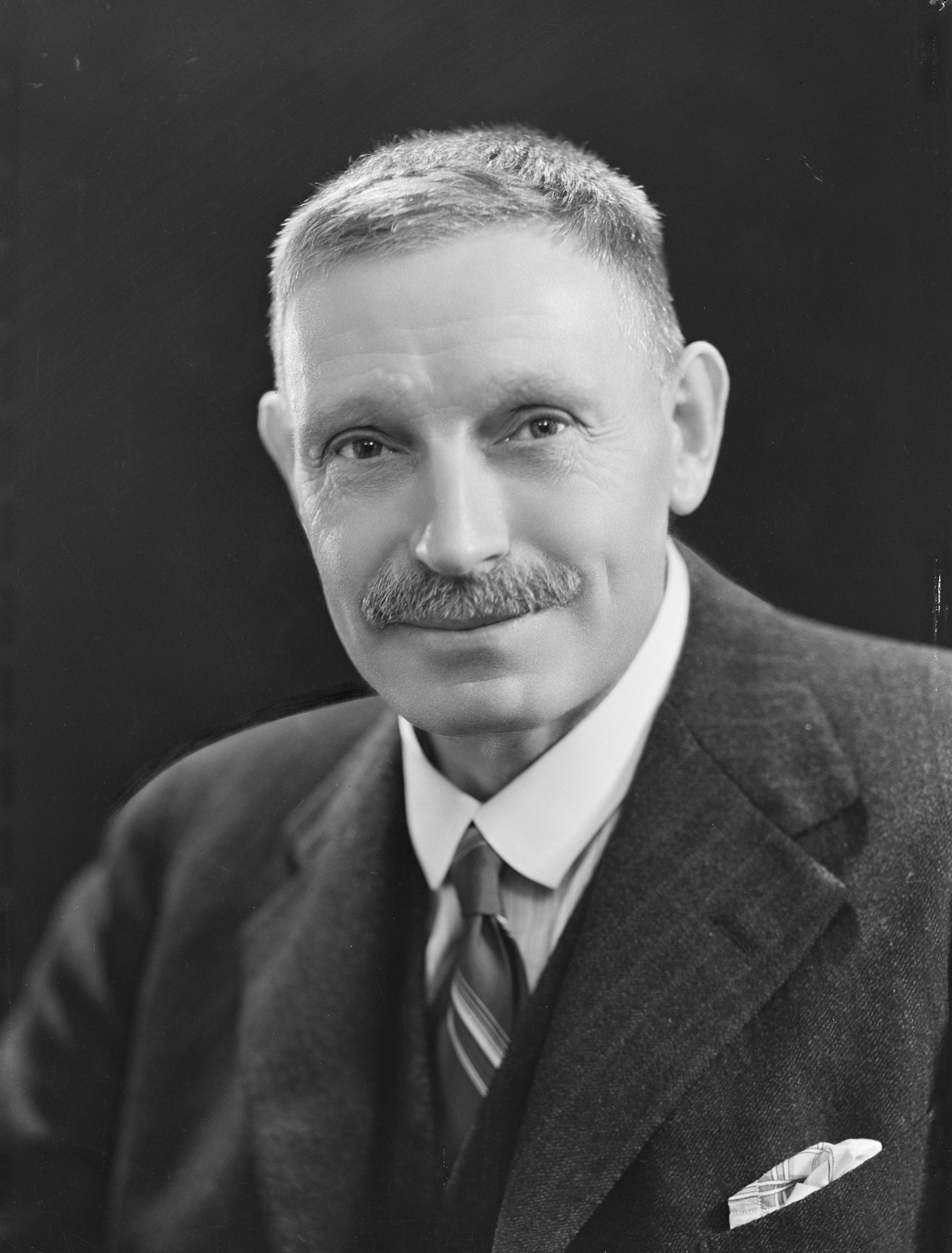
Adam Hamilton was the first leader of the National Party.

In hopes of countering Labour's rise, United and Reform decided to turn their alliance into a single party. This party, the New Zealand National Party, was formed at a meeting held in Wellington on 13 and 14 May 1936. Erstwhile members of the United and Reform parties made up the bulk of the new party. The United Party's last leader, George Forbes, Prime Minister from 1930 until 1935, opened the conference; he served as Leader of the Opposition from May until November, when former Reform MP Adam Hamilton, who had been a minister in the coalition government was elected the merged party's first leader. He got the top job primarily because of a compromise between Forbes and Reform leader Gordon Coates, neither of whom wished to serve under the other. Hamilton led the party into its first election in 1938. He was unable to effectively challenge Labour's popular Prime Minister, Michael Joseph Savage. Coupled with perceptions that he remained too much under the control of Coates and his lack of real support among his party colleagues, Hamilton was unable to prevent Labour's re-election in the 1938 election. In 1940, former Reform MP Sidney Holland replaced Hamilton. William Polson "acted effectively as Holland's deputy". One former Reform MP Bert Kyle resigned in 1942 in protest at the "autocratic" behaviour of Holland and the new party organisation.

In the 1943 election, National reduced Labour's majority from 12 seats to four. In the 1946 election, National made further gains, but Labour was able to cling to a one-seat majority. However, in the 1949 election, 13 years after the party's foundation, National won power after taking eight seats off Labour, and Holland became prime minister.

=== First Government (1949–1957) ===
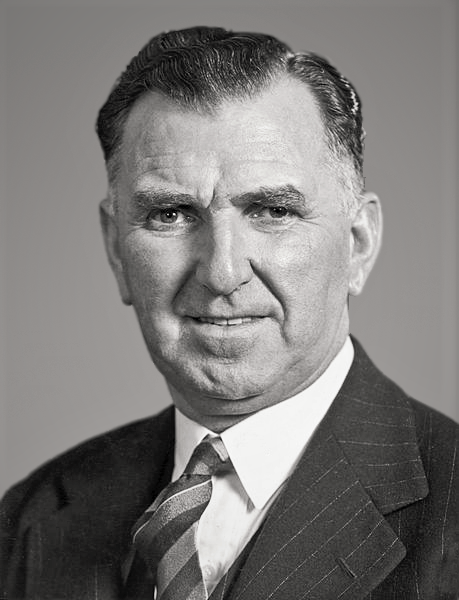
Sir Sidney Holland was the first National Prime Minister, 1949–1957

Sidney Holland was finance minister as well as prime minister in the new government. In 1949 National had campaigned on "the private ownership of production, distribution and exchange". Once in power the new Holland Government proved decidedly administratively conservative, retaining, for instance, compulsory unionism and the welfare state set up by the previous Labour government.

In 1951, the Waterfront Dispute broke out, lasting 151 days. The National government stepped into the conflict, acting in opposition to the maritime unions. Holland also used this opportunity to call the 1951 snap election. Campaigning on an anti-communist platform and exploiting the Labour Opposition's apparent indecisiveness, National returned with an increased majority, gaining 54 parliamentary seats out of 80.

In the 1954 election, National was elected to a third term, though losing some of its seats. Towards the end of his third term, however, Holland became increasingly ill, and stepped down from the leadership shortly before the general election in 1957. Keith Holyoake, the party's long-standing deputy leader, took Holland's place. Holyoake, however, had insufficient time to establish himself in the public mind as prime minister, and lost in the election later that year to Labour, then led by Walter Nash.

=== Second Government (1960–1972) ===
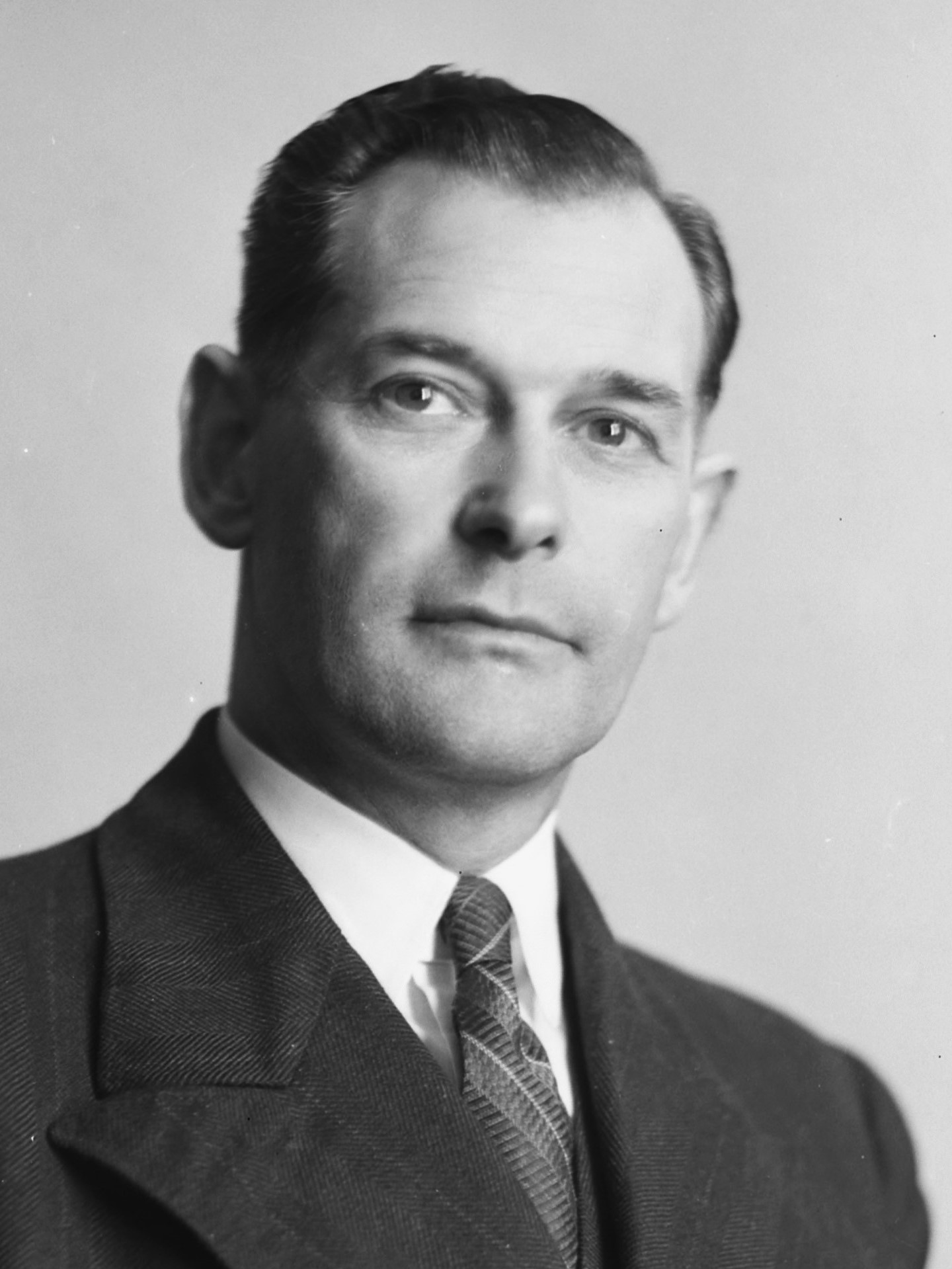
Sir Keith Holyoake, Prime Minister, 1957 and 1960–1972

Nash's government became very unpopular as Labour acquired a reputation for poor economic management, and much of the public saw its 1958 Budget, known since as the "Black Budget", as miserly. After only one term in office, Labour suffered defeat at the hands of Holyoake and the National Party in the elections of 1960.

Holyoake's government lasted 12 years, the party winning re-election three times (in 1963, 1966, and 1969). However, during this period Social Credit arose, which broke the National–Labour duopoly in parliament, winning former National seats from 1966. Holyoake retired from the premiership and from the party leadership at the beginning of 1972, and his deputy, Jack Marshall, replaced him.

Marshall suffered the same fate as Holyoake. Having succeeded an experienced leader in an election-year, he failed to establish himself in time. Marshall had an added disadvantage; he had to compete against the much more popular and charismatic Labour leader Norman Kirk, and lost the ensuing election. Unpopular policies, including initiating clear felling of parts of the Warawara kauri forest, also needlessly alienated voters.

=== Third Government (1975–1984) ===
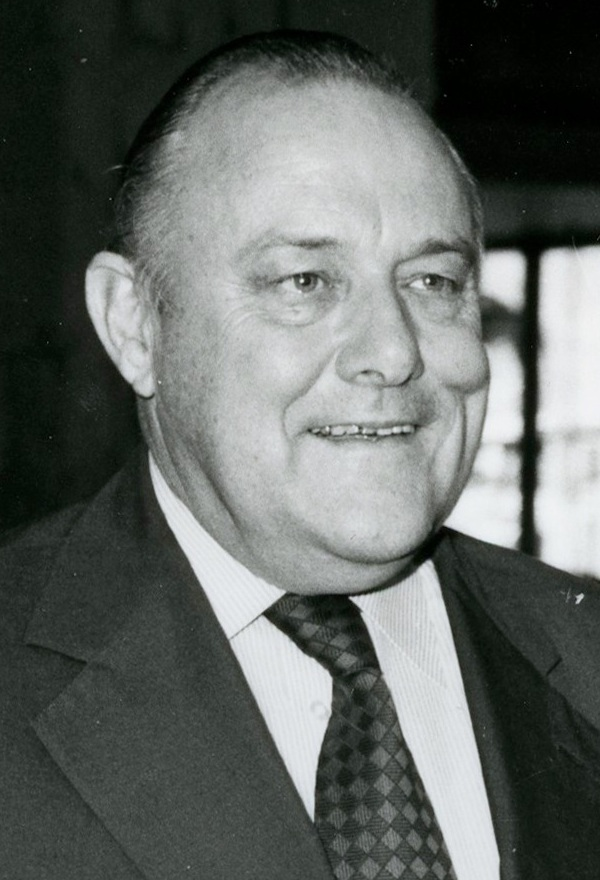
Sir Robert Muldoon, Prime Minister, 1975–1984

Within two years, the National Party removed Marshall as its parliamentary leader and replaced him with Robert Muldoon, who had previously served as Minister of Finance. An intense contest between Kirk and Muldoon followed. Kirk became ill and died in office (1974); his successor, Bill Rowling, proved no match for Muldoon, and in the 1975 election, National under Muldoon returned comfortably to power.

The Muldoon administration, which favoured interventionist economic policies, arouses mixed opinions amongst the free-market adherents of the modern National. Bill Birch's "Think Big" initiatives, designed to invest public money in energy self-sufficiency, stand in contrast to the party's contemporary views. Muldoon's autocratic leadership style became increasingly unpopular with both the public and the party, and together with disgruntlement over economic policy led to an attempted leadership change in 1980. Led by ministers Derek Quigley, Jim McLay, and Jim Bolger, the challenge (dubbed the "colonels' coup") against Muldoon aimed to replace him with Brian Talboys, his deputy. However, the plan collapsed as the result of Talboys' unwillingness, and Muldoon kept his position.

A former National Party logo, used during the Muldoon era

Under Muldoon, National won three consecutive general elections in 1975, 1978 and 1981. However, public dissatisfaction grew, and Muldoon's controlling and belligerent style of leadership became less and less appealing. In both the 1978 and 1981 elections, National gained fewer votes than the Labour opposition, but could command a small majority in Parliament because of the then-used First Past the Post electoral system.

Dissent within the National Party continued to grow, however, with rebel National MPs Marilyn Waring and Mike Minogue causing particular concern to the leadership, threatening National's thin majority in parliament. When, in 1984, Marilyn Waring refused to support Muldoon's policies on visits by nuclear-powered and nuclear-armed ships, Muldoon called a snap election. Muldoon made the television announcement of this election while visibly inebriated, and some believe that he later regretted the decision to "go to the country". National lost the election to Labour under David Lange.

=== Fourth Government (1990–1999) ===
Shortly after this loss, the National Party removed Muldoon from the leadership. Jim McLay, who had replaced Duncan MacIntyre as deputy leader shortly before the election, became the new leader. McLay, an urban liberal with right-wing views on economics, however, failed to restore the party's fortunes. In 1986 Jim Bolger took over the leadership with the support of centrists within the party.

In the 1990 election, National defeated Labour in an electoral landslide and formed a new government under Jim Bolger. However, the party lost some support from Muldoon era policy based conservatives when it continued the economic reforms which had ultimately led to the defeat of the previous Labour government—these policies, started by Labour Party Finance Minister Roger Douglas and popularly known as Rogernomics, centred on the privatisation of state assets and on the removal of tariffs and subsidies. These policies alienated traditional Labour supporters, who saw them as a betrayal of the party's social service based character, but did not appear to appease the membership base of the non-parliamentary party either, which still had a significant supporter base for the statist intervention style policies of the Muldoon Government.

Many more conservative and centrist National supporters preferred Muldoon's more authoritarian and interventionist policies over the free-market liberalism promoted by Douglas. However, the new National Party Finance Minister, Ruth Richardson, strongly supported Rogernomics, believing that Douglas had not gone far enough. Her policies—dubbed "Ruthanasia"— encouraged two MPs to leave the National Party and form the Liberal Party. Richardson's views also met with considerable opposition within the National Party Parliamentary Caucus and for a time caused damage to the party's membership base.

At the 1993 election, National was narrowly able to retain government owing partly to a slight economic recovery and the opposition being split between three competing parties. National's unprecedented eighteen-seat majority had virtually disappeared and the country faced an election night hung parliament for the first time since 1931, with National one seat short of the required 50 seats to govern. Final special votes counted over the following days revealed National had won Waitaki, allowing it to form a government with the majority of one seat but required the election of a Speaker from the opposition benches (Peter Tapsell of the Labour Party) to hold a working majority in the House. At the same time as the election, however, a referendum took place which established the MMP electoral system for future use in New Zealand general elections as widespread dissatisfaction with the existing political system led to reform. This would have a significant impact on New Zealand politics. Some National Party MPs defected to a new grouping, United New Zealand in mid-1995 whilst other splinter parties emerged. And, as a result of the new electoral mechanics, the New Zealand First party, led by former National MP and former Cabinet minister Winston Peters, held the balance of power after the 1996 election. After a prolonged period of negotiation lasting nearly two months, in which New Zealand First played National and Labour off against each other (both parties negotiated complete coalition agreements), New Zealand First entered into a coalition with National despite the fact many expected Peters to form such a coalition with Labour.

Under the coalition agreement, Peters became Deputy Prime Minister and had the post of Treasurer especially created by the Crown for him. New Zealand First extracted a number of other concessions from National in exchange for its support. The influence of New Zealand First angered many National MPs, particularly Jenny Shipley.

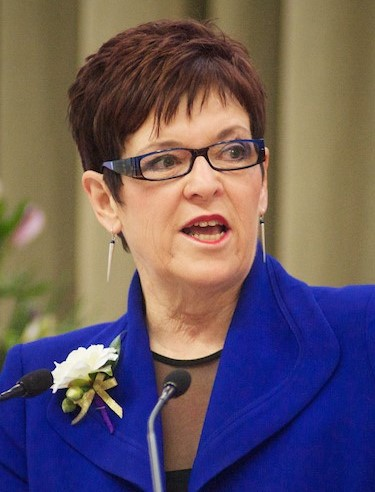
Dame Jenny Shipley, Prime Minister, 1997–1999

When, in 1997, Shipley toppled Bolger to become National's new leader, relations between National and its coalition partner quickly deteriorated. After Shipley sacked Peters from Cabinet in 1998, New Zealand First split into two groups and half the MPs followed Peters out of the coalition but the remainder broke away, establishing themselves as independents or as members of new parties of which none survived the 1999 election. From the latter group National gained enough support to continue in government with additional confidence support of Alamein Kopu a defect Alliance List MP. The visibly damaged National Government managed to survive the parliamentary term, but lost the election to Labour's Helen Clark and the Alliance's Jim Anderton, who formed a coalition government leaving National in opposition for nine years.

=== Opposition (1999–2008) ===
Shipley continued to lead the National Party until 2001, when Bill English replaced her. English, however, proved unable to gain traction against Clark, and National suffered its worst-ever electoral defeat in the 2002 election, gaining only 27 of 120 seats. Many hoped that English would succeed in rebuilding the party, given time, but a year later polling showed the party performing only slightly better than in the election. In October 2003 English gave way as leader to Don Brash, a former governor of the Reserve Bank who had joined the National Parliamentary caucus in the 2002 election.

Under Brash, the National Party's overall popularity with voters improved markedly. Mostly, however, the party achieved this by "reclaiming" support from electors who voted for other centre-right parties in 2002. National's campaigning on race relations, amid claims of preferential treatment of Māori, and amid their opposition to Labour Party policy during the foreshore-and-seabed controversy, generated considerable publicity and much controversy. Strong campaigning on a tax-cuts theme in the lead-up to the 2005 election, together with a consolidation of centre-right support, may have contributed to the National Party's winning 48 out of 121 seats in Parliament. National, however, remained the second-largest party in Parliament (marginally behind Labour, which gained 50 seats), and had fewer options for forming a coalition government. With the formation of a new Labour-dominated Government, National remained the major Opposition party. Before the leadership of John Key, the National Party had made renewed efforts to attract social conservative voters, through adoption of anti-abortion and anti-same-sex marriage policies.

In the 2005 general election run up, it was revealed that the Exclusive Brethren, a conservative Christian group, had distributed attack pamphlets critical of the Labour Party and praising of National to letterboxes throughout New Zealand. Labour insisted that National had close ties to and prior knowledge of these attacks, which was repeatedly denied by National. It was later admitted by the leader Don Brash that he indeed did have knowledge of the plan, a statement that was contradicted by MP Gerry Brownlee who subsequently denied the National party had any foreknowledge.

After the 2005 election defeat Don Brash's leadership of National came under scrutiny from the media, and political watchers speculated on the prospect of a leadership-challenge before the next general election due in 2008. Brash resigned on 23 November 2006, immediately before the release of Nicky Hager's book The Hollow Men, which contained damaging revelations obtained from private emails. John Key became the leader of the National caucus on 27 November 2006. Key fostered a more "centrist" image, discussing issues such as child poverty.

=== Fifth Government (2008–2017) ===
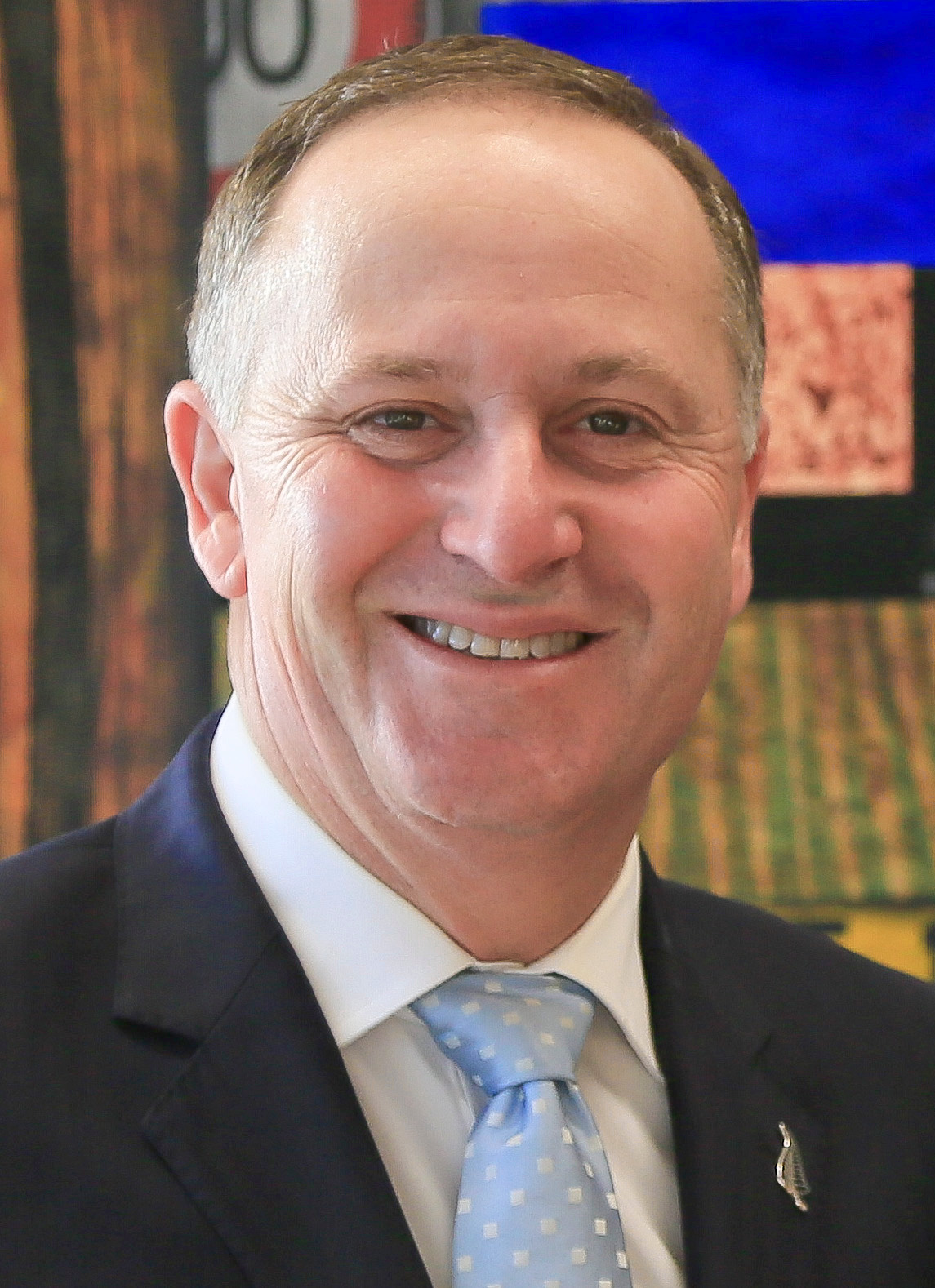
Sir John Key, Prime Minister, 2008–2016

On 8 November 2008, the National Party won 58 seats in the general election. The Labour Party, which had spent three terms in power, conceded the election and Prime Minister Helen Clark stepped down. National formed a minority government under John Key with confidence-and-supply support from the ACT Party (5 seats), the Māori Party (5 seats) and United Future (1 seat). On 19 November the Governor-General swore in the new National-led government. In Key's first Cabinet he gave the ACT Party's Rodney Hide and Heather Roy ministerial portfolios outside Cabinet, and the Māori Party's Tāriana Turia and Pita Sharples the same. United Future leader Peter Dunne retained his ministerial post outside Cabinet which he had held within the immediately preceding Labour Government.

National came to power during the 2008 financial crisis. In response to New Zealand's rising debt, Finance Minister Bill English made budget deficit-reduction his main priority for the first term. The government also cut taxes on all income; the top personal tax rate was lowered from 39% to 38% and then 33% in 2010.

At the 26 November 2011 general election, National gained 47.31% of the party vote, the highest percentage gained by any political party since MMP was introduced, helped by a lower voter turnout and the misfortunes of its traditional support parties. A reduced wasted vote enabled the party to gain 59 seats in Parliament, one more than in 2008. National re-entered confidence-and-supply agreements with ACT (one seat) and United Future (one seat) on 5 December 2011, enabling it to form a minority government with the support of 61 seats in the new 121-seat Parliament. National also re-entered a confidence-and-supply agreement with the Māori Party on 11 December 2011 for extra insurance, despite the parties differing on National's contentious plans to partially sell (or "extend the mixed ownership model to") four state-owned enterprises. This nearly led to a cancellation of the agreement in February 2012 over Treaty of Waitangi obligations for the mixed ownership companies, and again in July 2012 over water rights.

The government also introduced the "mixed ownership model" plan, in which the Government planned to reduce its share in Genesis Energy, Meridian Energy, Mighty River Power and Solid Energy from 100% to 51% and Air New Zealand from 74% to 51%, and sell off the remainder. The plans to sell down Solid Energy were later axed due to the company's poor financial position. A citizens-initiated referendum on the sell-downs returned a 67.3% vote in opposition (on a turnout of 45.1%).

The National Government won a third term at the 2014 general election. The National Party won 47.04% of the party vote, and increased its seats to 60. National resumed its confidence and supply agreements with ACT and United Future. The National government extended free general practitioner visits to children under 13 as part of their 2014 election package, as well as extending paid parental leave by two weeks to 16 weeks. The National parliamentary caucus was split on the issue of same-sex marriage in 2014.

Throughout his second and third terms, Key campaigned heavily in favour of free-trade agreements such as the Trans-Pacific Partnership.

After serving prime minister for eight years, Key announced his resignation as the party leader on 5 December 2016. He stepped down as prime minister on 12 December. Key's deputy Bill English was acclaimed as the party's new leader on 12 December 2016 after Health Minister Jonathan Coleman and Minister of Police Judith Collins withdrew from the leadership election.

=== Opposition (2017–2023) ===
In the 2017 general election, National's share of the party vote dropped to 44.4%. It lost four seats, dropping to 56, but remained the largest party in Parliament. Two of the National government's three support parties lost representation in parliament. New Zealand First, led by Winston Peters, held the balance of power, and formed a coalition with Labour, who also gained Green Party support, marking an end to the 9-year National government. English announced his intention to stay on as party leader until the 2020 general election but subsequently resigned. On 27 February 2018, English was succeeded by Simon Bridges.

Following the Christchurch Mosque shootings, the party removed content from their website which indicated opposition to the UN Migration Compact; a position also espoused by the terrorist in his manifesto. On 2 July 2020, however, the party's new leader Todd Muller confirmed in response to a question from a journalist that the party was still opposed to the pact, although it was not an issue he was focused on.

On 22 May 2020, following poor poll results for the party during the COVID-19 pandemic in New Zealand, the National Party held an emergency caucus meeting and voted to oust both leader Simon Bridges and deputy leader Paula Bennett, replacing them with Todd Muller and Nikki Kaye, respectively. Less than two months later, Muller resigned citing that his position had "become untenable from a health perspective". This came after a series of gaffes and scandals surrounding Muller and the National caucus during his tenure, triggering the second leadership election in as many months. He was succeeded by Judith Collins. Kaye, who served as interim leader during the hours between Muller's resignation and Collins's election, was succeeded by Gerry Brownlee. Collins led the party through the 2020 election, but was unable to recoup polling losses seen by the party throughout 2020 in time for the election, leading to the party losing 23 seats and suffering the second worst defeat in its history. Brownlee, who was the party campaign manager, lost his electorate seat, returning as an MP via the party list and resigning as deputy leader two weeks later; he was replaced by Shane Reti.

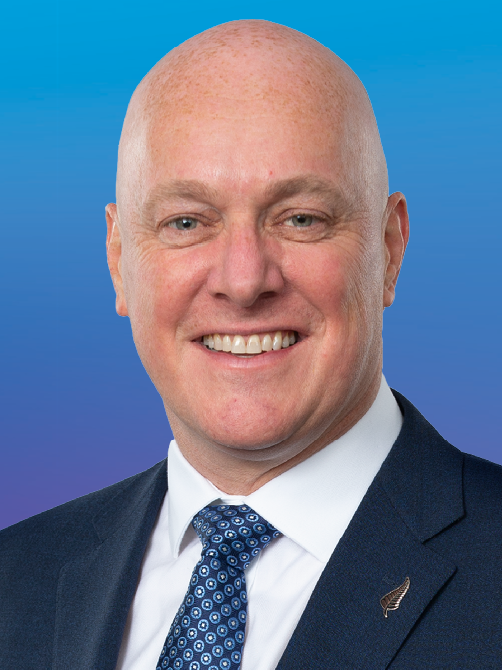
Christopher Luxon has served as the party's leader since November 2021.

On 1 February 2021, Collins announced that the National Party would contest the Māori electorates at the 2023 New Zealand general election. Her successor Christopher Luxon confirmed they would still be contesting the seats under his leadership.

On 24 November 2021, Collins announced that Bridges was being demoted and stripped of his portfolios, in what was seen by many inside and outside the caucus (including National MP and Bridges' brother in-law Simon O'Connor) as an act of political revenge. O'Connor later announced that he was resigning his portfolios in protest, and demanded Collins' own resignation. Collins was removed as leader in an emergency caucus meeting the following morning, with Reti becoming interim leader. Christopher Luxon was elected unopposed, with Nicola Willis as his deputy, after Simon Bridges withdrew his candidacy.

=== Sixth Government (2023–present) ===
During the 2023 general election held on 14 October, National under the leadership of Christopher Luxon defeated the incumbent Labour Party. National won 38.08% of the popular vote and gained 48 seats. National's traditional coalition partner ACT won 11 seats, leaving a prospective National–ACT coalition just short of a majority with 59 seats. National formed a majority government with ACT and New Zealand First, the first three-party coalition under MMP.

In late January 2026, National and the opposition Labour Party agreed to co-sponsor new legislation targeting modern slavery despite opposition from ACT, National's coalition partner.

== Ideology and factions ==
The New Zealand National Party has been characterised as a "broad church", encompassing both conservative and liberal tendencies, and outlying populist and libertarian tendencies. All factions tend to be in tension, although the conservative tendency frequently prevails. The broad liberal tendency is expressed by both social liberals and the classical liberals, with the latter supporting economic liberalism. The early National Party was united in its anti-socialism, in opposition to the Labour Party.

The party's principles include "loyalty to our country, its democratic principles and our Sovereign as Head of State; recognition of the Treaty of Waitangi as the founding document of New Zealand; national and personal security; equal citizenship and equal opportunity; individual freedom and choice; personal responsibility; competitive enterprise and rewards for achievement; limited government; strong families and caring communities; sustainable development of our environment." In economic policy, the "National Party appears to have a lot of faith in the efficiency of markets [...]". National supports a limited welfare state but says that work, merit, innovation and personal initiative must be encouraged to reduce unemployment and boost economic growth. In a 1959 speech, party leader and Prime Minister Keith Holyoake encapsulated the conservative and liberal principles of the National Party:

We believe in the maximum degree of personal freedom and the maximum degree of individual choice for our people. We believe in the least interference necessary with individual rights, and the least possible degree of state interference.

Historically, National supported a higher degree of state intervention than it has in recent decades. The First, Second and Third National governments (1950s–1980s) generally sought to preserve the economic and social stability of New Zealand, mainly keeping intact the high degree of protectionism and the strong welfare state built up by the First Labour Government. The last major interventionist policy was Prime Minister Robert Muldoon's massive infrastructure projects designed to ensure New Zealand's energy independence after the 1973 oil shock, Think Big. In contrast, the Fourth National Government (1990–1999) mostly carried on the sweeping free-market reforms of the Fourth Labour Government known as Rogernomics (after Labour's finance minister Sir Roger Douglas). The corporatisation and sale of numerous state-owned enterprises, the abolition of collective bargaining and major government spending cuts were introduced under the Fourth National Government, policies that were popularly known as Ruthanasia (National's finance minister at the time was Ruth Richardson). The Fifth National Government (2008–2017) took a relatively centrist position.

The Sixth Government from 2023 has taken a more right-wing position, including cutting state welfare and ending what it calls 'welfare dependency'. Other positions include eliminating all references to gender, sexuality and "relationship-based education guidelines" in educational curriculums, repealing the previous government's ban on offshore gas- and oil-exploration, restricting the number of doctors who can issue medical certificates for health and disability limits, and reducing state spending. The party also supported scrapping the previous Labour Government's Fair Pay Agreements Act 2022, no-cause eviction ban, public-transport discounts, hate-speech legislation, co-governance policies, Auckland light rail, Three Waters reform programme, and the Māori Health Authority.

The party has mixed views on abortion, with some MPs being against while others for. In a conscience vote, National Party MPs voted largely against the Abortion Legislation Act 2020.

=== Voter base ===
The National Party's core base has traditionally comprised European New Zealanders (Pākehā), social conservatives and rural voters, although it targets other groups too. National has retained a reputation for showing more favour to farmers and to business than Labour; the party provides for its support through incentives for farmers.

== Organisation ==
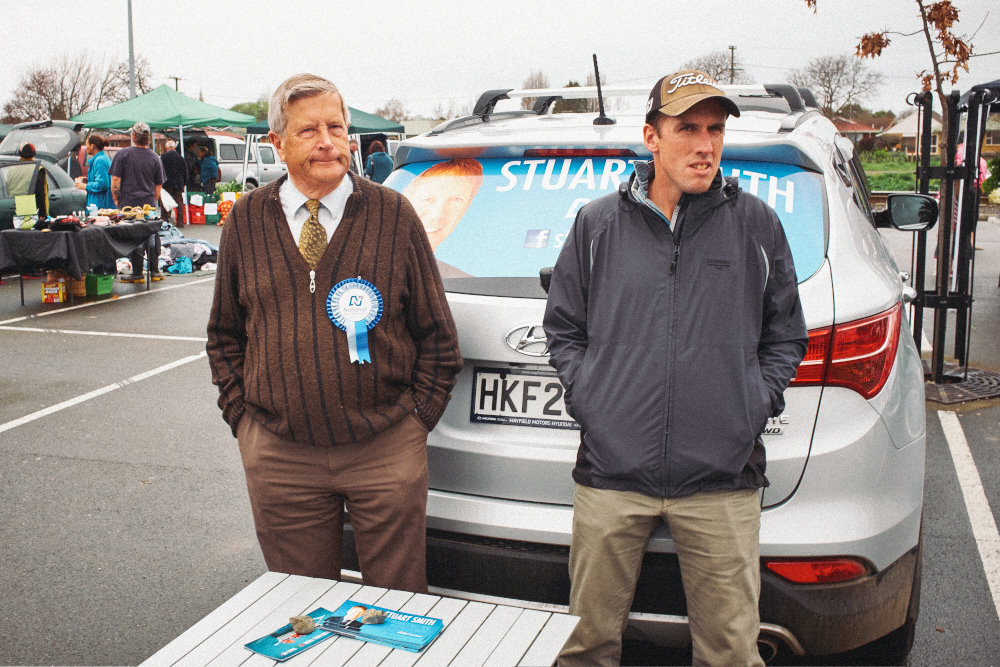
National Party election campaigners in Kaikōura, 2014

In the 1930s National first emulated and then outstripped Labour in building a large low-fee membership, with wide grassroots support. By the mid-1970s it claimed to have around 200,000 members. Since 1981 National (as well as the Labour Party) has suffered a steady decline in membership. By the early 2000s party membership was below 30,000.

National features both regional and electorate-level organisational structures. National traditionally had a strongly decentralised organisation, designed to allow electorates and the five regions to appeal to the unique voter base in their area. However, in light of the 2002 election result, in which the party suffered a significant loss of its support base, a review of the party organisation resulted in decisions to weaken the regional structure and to implement a more centralised structure. The restructuring was ostensibly planned to make the party organisation more "appropriate" for the mixed-member proportional electoral system, where votes are cast for a countrywide party list.

Currently, the affairs of the party are centrally governed by a Board of Directors, comprising the party leader, one caucus representative, the party's general manager and seven elected members. The board elects a party president from within its members. An Annual Conference determines party policy, and elects members to the Board of Directors. The party is subdivided into Electorate Committees; each committee sends six delegates to Annual Conference, including a chair and any MPs from within the electorate.

The leader of the National Party (currently Christopher Luxon), elected by the party's current sitting MPs, acts as a spokesperson for National and is responsible for managing the party's business within parliament. The president (currently Sylvia Wood, elected to the role in August 2022) heads the administration outside of parliament.

Within National there are a number of organised groups of members, called Special Interest Groups, that share a particular belief, interest or cause. Other groups are also involved in the party's policy reviews. For instance, the Bluegreens are a group within National who help formulate environmental policy. The party's youth wing, the Young Nationals (commonly known as the Young Nats), has provided much political impetus as a ginger group. Often the more social-liberal views of the Young Nats have been at odds with those in the senior party.

National is affiliated to—and plays a leading part in—the International Democracy Union (IDU) and the Asia Pacific Democrat Union (APDU). Former National Prime Minister John Key was the chairman of the IDU from 2014 to 2018.

== Electoral performance ==
=== House of Representatives ===
Election	Leader	Votes	%	Seats	+/–	Position	Status
1938	Adam Hamilton	381,081	40.30%	25 / 80	▲25	▲2nd	Opposition
1943	Sidney Holland	402,887	42.78%	34 / 80	▲9	2nd	Opposition
1946	Sidney Holland	507,139	48.43%	38 / 80	▲4	2nd	Opposition
1949	Sidney Holland	556,805	51.88%	46 / 80	▲8	▲1st	Majority
1951	Sidney Holland	577,630	53.99%	50 / 80	▲4	1st	Majority
1954	Sidney Holland	485,630	44.27%	45 / 80	▼5	1st	Majority
1957	Keith Holyoake	511,699	44.21%	39 / 80	▼6	▼2nd	Opposition
1960	Keith Holyoake	557,046	47.59%	46 / 80	▲7	▲1st	Majority
1963	Keith Holyoake	563,875	47.12%	45 / 80	▼1	1st	Majority
1966	Keith Holyoake	525,945	43.64%	44 / 80	▼1	1st	Majority
1969	Keith Holyoake	605,960	45.22%	45 / 84	▲1	1st	Majority
1972	Jack Marshall	581,422	41.50%	32 / 87	▼13	▼2nd	Opposition
1975	Robert Muldoon	763,136	47.59%	55 / 87	▲23	▲1st	Majority
1978	Robert Muldoon	680,991	39.82%	51 / 92	▼4	1st	Majority
1981	Robert Muldoon	698,508	38.77%	47 / 92	▼4	1st	Majority
1984	Robert Muldoon	692,494	35.89%	37 / 95	▼10	▼2nd	Opposition
1987	Jim Bolger	806,305	44.02%	40 / 97	▲3	2nd	Opposition
1990	Jim Bolger	872,358	47.82%	67 / 97	▲27	▲1st	Majority
1993	Jim Bolger	673,892	35.05%	50 / 99	▼17	1st	Majority
1996	Jim Bolger	701,315	33.87%	44 / 120	▼6	1st	Coalition (1996–1998)
1996	Jim Bolger	701,315	33.87%	44 / 120	▼6	1st	Minority (1998–1999)
1999	Jenny Shipley	629,932	30.50%	39 / 120	▼5	▼2nd	Opposition
2002	Bill English	425,310	20.93%	27 / 120	▼12	2nd	Opposition
2005	Don Brash	889,813	39.10%	48 / 121	▲21	2nd	Opposition
2008	John Key	1,053,398	44.93%	58 / 122	▲10	▲1st	Minority
2011	John Key	1,058,638	47.31%	59 / 121	▲1	1st	Minority
2014	John Key	1,131,501	47.04%	60 / 121	▲1	1st	Minority
2017	Bill English	1,152,075	44.45%	56 / 120	▼4	1st	Opposition
2020	Judith Collins	738,275	25.58%	33 / 120	▼23	▼2nd	Opposition
2023	Christopher Luxon	1,085,016	38.06%	48 / 123	▲15	▲1st	Coalition
2026	Christopher Luxon	TBD	TBD	42 / 131	▼6	1st	TBD
Source: Electoral Commission

== Leadership ==
=== Party leaders since 1936 ===
Key:
National Labour
PM: Prime Minister
LO: Leader of the Opposition

No.	Name	Portrait	Term of Office		Position	Prime Minister
1	Adam Hamilton		2 November 1936	26 November 1940	LO 1936–1940	Savage
1	Adam Hamilton		2 November 1936	26 November 1940	LO 1936–1940	Fraser
2	Sidney Holland		26 November 1940	20 September 1957	LO 1940–1949	Fraser
2	Sidney Holland		26 November 1940	20 September 1957	PM 1949–1957	Holland
3	Keith Holyoake		20 September 1957	7 February 1972	PM 1957	Holyoake
3	Keith Holyoake		20 September 1957	7 February 1972	LO 1957–1960	Nash
3	Keith Holyoake		20 September 1957	7 February 1972	PM 1960–1972	Holyoake
4	Jack Marshall		7 February 1972	4 July 1974	PM 1972	Marshall
4	Jack Marshall		7 February 1972	4 July 1974	LO 1972–1974	Kirk
5	Robert Muldoon		4 July 1974	29 November 1984	LO 1974–1975	Kirk
5	Robert Muldoon		4 July 1974	29 November 1984	LO 1974–1975	Rowling
5	Robert Muldoon		4 July 1974	29 November 1984	PM 1975–1984	Muldoon
5	Robert Muldoon		4 July 1974	29 November 1984	LO 1984	Lange
6	Jim McLay		29 November 1984	26 March 1986	LO 1984–1986	Lange
7	Jim Bolger		26 March 1986	8 December 1997	LO 1986–1990	Lange
7	Jim Bolger		26 March 1986	8 December 1997	LO 1986–1990	Palmer
7	Jim Bolger		26 March 1986	8 December 1997	LO 1986–1990	Moore
7	Jim Bolger		26 March 1986	8 December 1997	PM 1990–1997	Bolger
8	Jenny Shipley		8 December 1997	8 October 2001	PM 1997–1999	Shipley
8	Jenny Shipley		8 December 1997	8 October 2001	LO 1999–2001	Clark
9	Bill English		8 October 2001	28 October 2003	LO 2001–2003	Clark
10	Don Brash		28 October 2003	27 November 2006	LO 2003–2006	Clark
11	John Key		27 November 2006	12 December 2016	LO 2006–2008	Clark
11	John Key		27 November 2006	12 December 2016	PM 2008–2016	Key
(9)	Bill English		12 December 2016	27 February 2018	PM 2016–2017	English
(9)	Bill English		12 December 2016	27 February 2018	LO 2017–2018	Ardern
12	Simon Bridges		27 February 2018	22 May 2020	LO 2018–2020	Ardern
13	Todd Muller		22 May 2020	14 July 2020	LO 2020	Ardern
14	Judith Collins		14 July 2020	25 November 2021	LO 2020–2021	Ardern
15	Christopher Luxon		30 November 2021	Incumbent	LO 2021–2023	Ardern
15	Christopher Luxon		30 November 2021	Incumbent	LO 2021–2023	Hipkins
15	Christopher Luxon		30 November 2021	Incumbent	PM 2023–present	Luxon

==== Living former party leaders ====
As of October 2025, there are eight living former party leaders, as seen below.

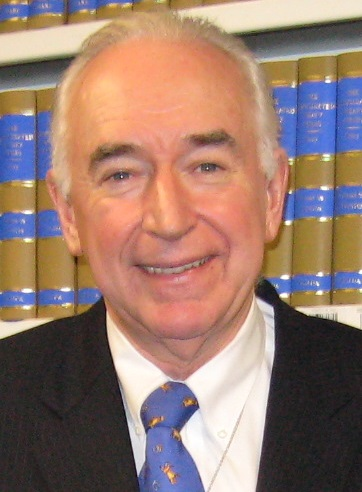
Sir Jim McLay
served 1984–1986
born 1945 (age 81)

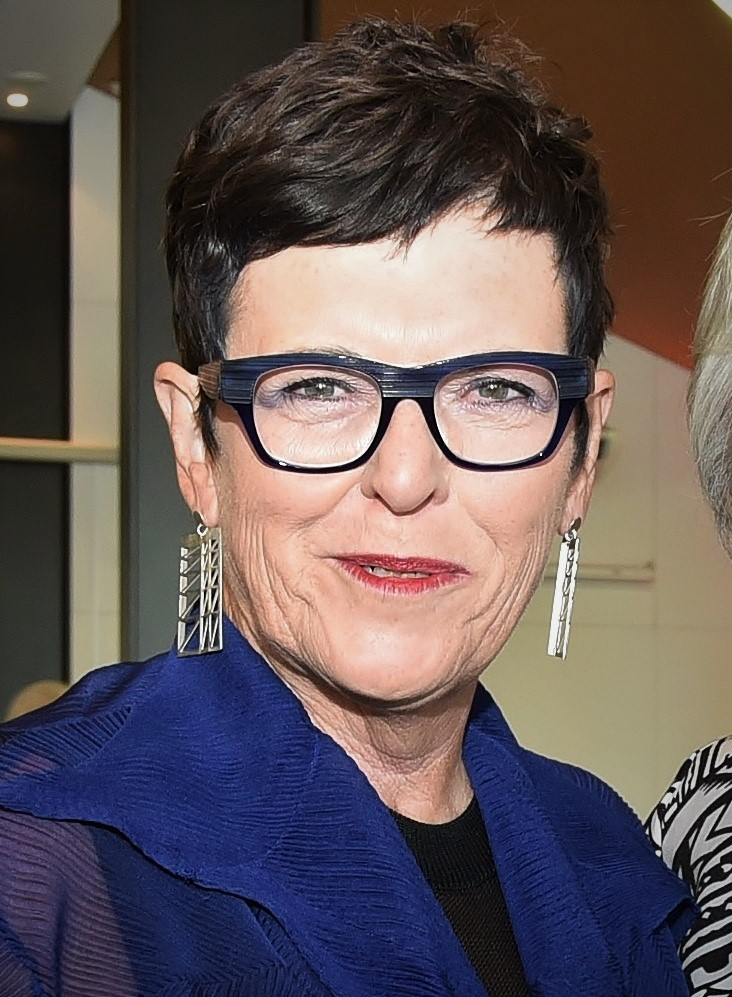
Dame Jenny Shipley
served 1997–2001
born 1952 (age 74)

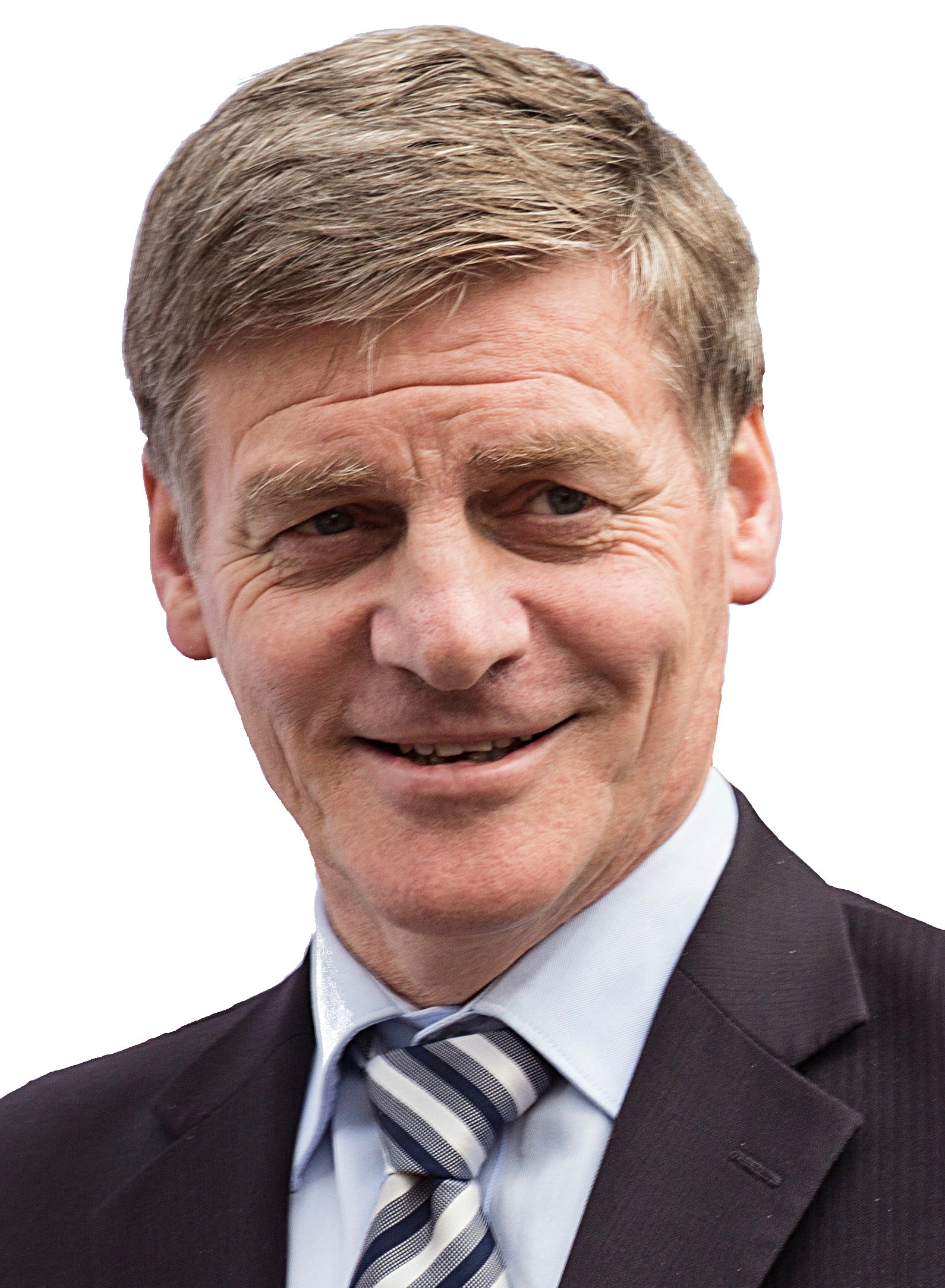
Sir Bill English
served 2001–03; 2016–18
born 1961 (age 64)

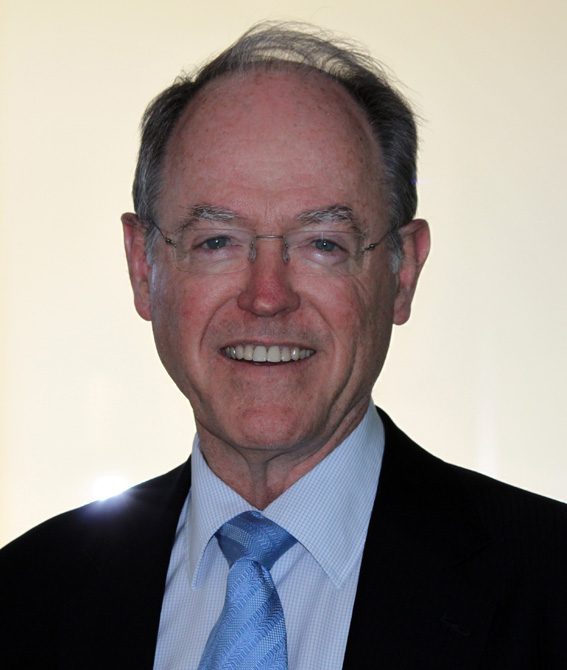
Don Brash
served 2003–2006
born 1940 (age 86)

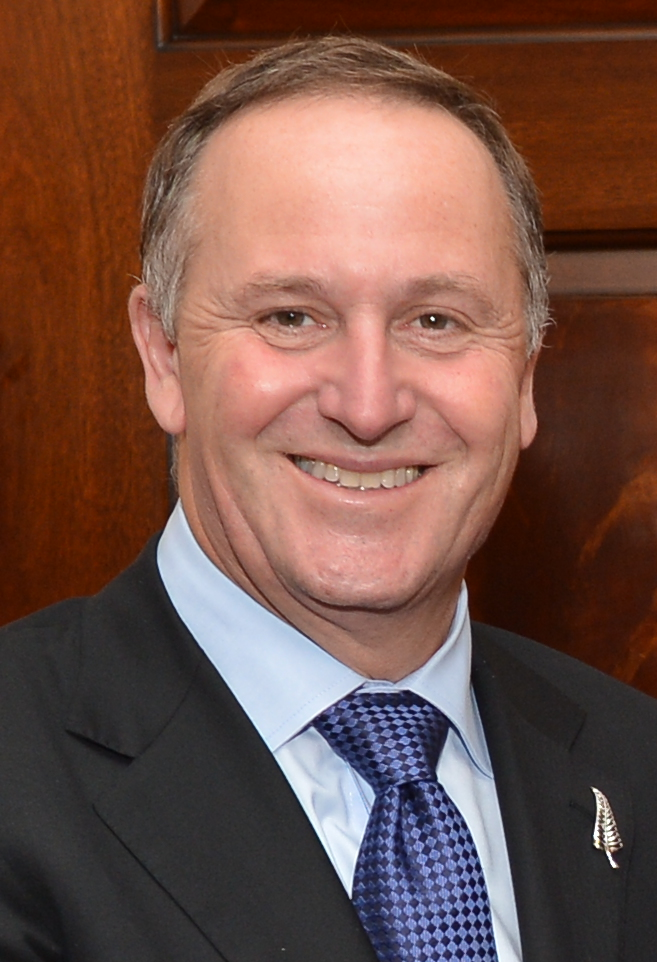
Sir John Key
served 2006–2016
born 1961 (age 65)

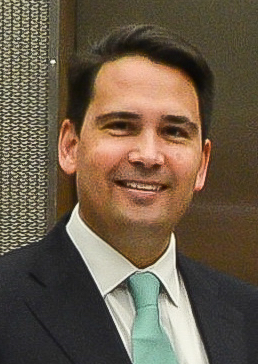
Simon Bridges
served 2018–2020
born 1976 (age 50)

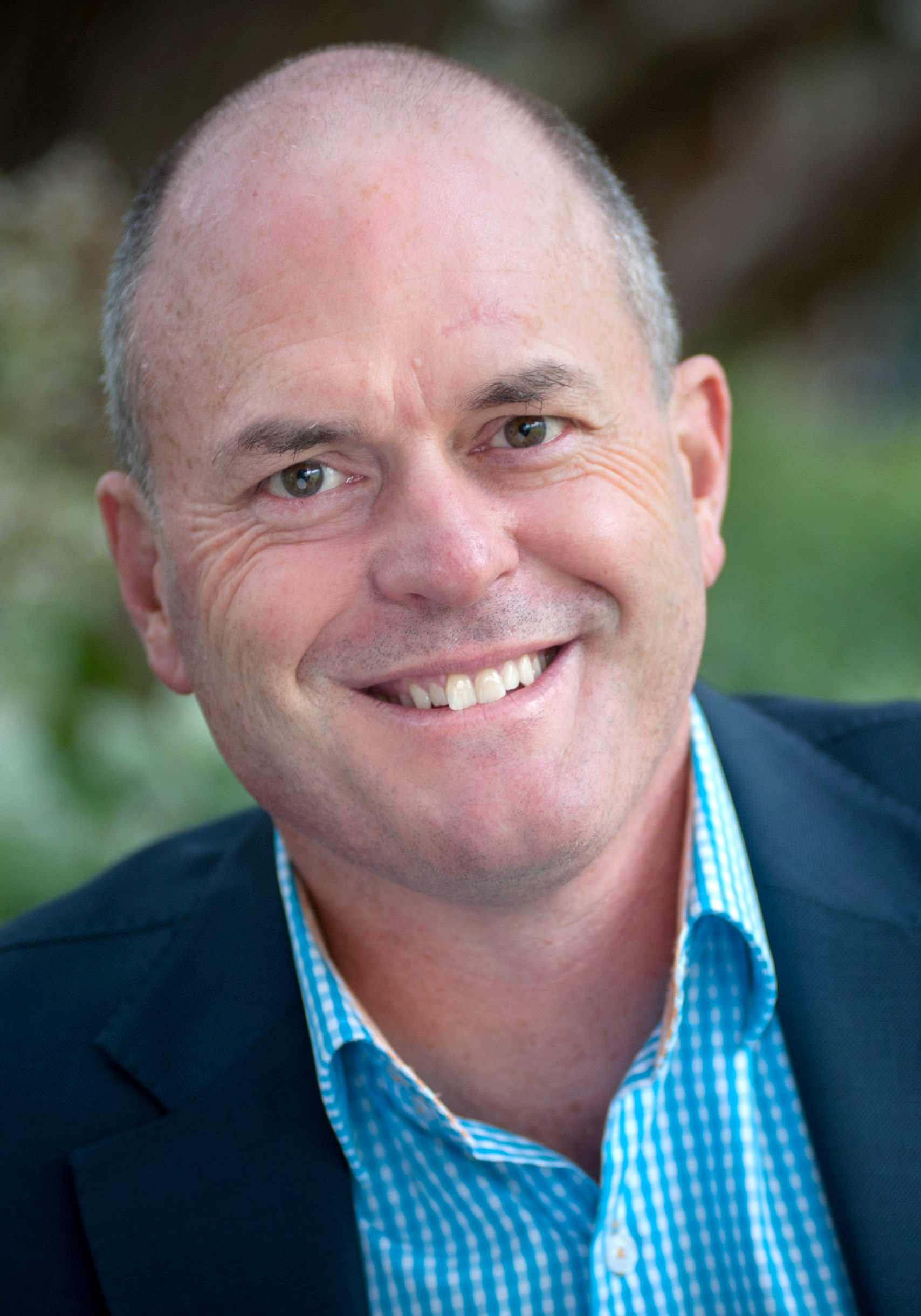
Todd Muller
served 2020
born 1968 (age 57)

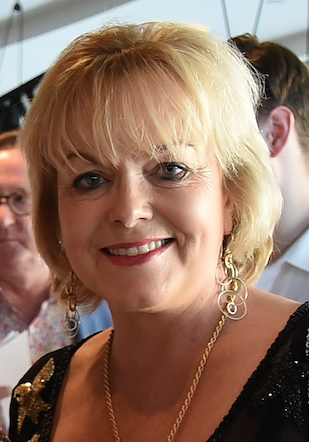
Judith Collins
served 2020–2021
born 1959 (age 67)

=== Deputy leaders ===
No.	Name	Term
1	George Forbes	1937–1941
2	William Polson	1940–1946
3	Keith Holyoake	1946–1957
4	Jack Marshall	1957–1972
5	Robert Muldoon	1972–1974
6	Brian Talboys	1974–1981
7	Duncan MacIntyre	1981–1984
8	Jim McLay	1984
9	Jim Bolger	1984–1986
10	George Gair	1986–1987
11	Don McKinnon	1987–1997
12	Wyatt Creech	1997–2001
13	Bill English	2001
14	Roger Sowry	2001–2003
15	Nick Smith	2003
16	Gerry Brownlee	2003–2006
(12)	Bill English	2006–2016
17	Paula Bennett	2016–2020
18	Nikki Kaye	2020
(16)	Gerry Brownlee	2020
19	Shane Reti	2020–2021
20	Nicola Willis	2021–present

=== Party presidents ===
No.	Name	Term
1	George Wilson	1936
2	Claude Weston	1936–1940
3	Alex Gordon	1940–1944
4	Wilfrid Sim	1944–1951
5	Alex McKenzie	1951–1962
6	Jack Meadowcroft	1962–1966
7	Ned Holt	1966–1973
8	George Chapman	1973–1982
9	Sue Wood	1982–1986
10	Neville Young	1986–1989
11	John Collinge	1989–1994
12	Lindsay Tisch	1994
13	Geoff Thompson	1994–1998
14	John Slater	1998–2001
15	Michelle Boag	2001–2002
16	Judy Kirk	2002–2009
17	Peter Goodfellow	2009–2022
18	Sylvia Wood	2022–present

Short biographies of all presidents up to Sue Wood appear in Barry Gustafson's The First Fifty Years.

== See also ==
- Politics of New Zealand
- List of New Zealand–related topics § Political parties
- List of conservative parties by country
- List of liberal parties by country
- List of major liberal parties considered right
