= Fred Goodfellow =

English rugby union and rugby league footballer

Personal information
- Full name: Frederick Goodfellow
- Born: 1878 Tunstall, Staffordshire, England
- Died: third ¼ 1925 (aged 46) Sharlston, Wakefield

Playing information

Rugby union
Representative
| Years | Team | Pld | T | G | FG | P |
|---|---|---|---|---|---|---|
| 1897–98 | Yorkshire | ≥2 |

Rugby league
- Position: Wing, Centre
Club
| Years | Team | Pld | T | G | FG | P |
|---|---|---|---|---|---|---|
| 1899–04 | Holbeck |
| 1904–06 | Hull FC |
| 1906–10 | Dewsbury |
| | Total | 0 | 0 | 0 | 0 | 0 |
Representative
| Years | Team | Pld | T | G | FG | P |
| 1907 | Yorkshire | 1 | 1 | 2 | 0 | 7 |

Frederick "Fred" Goodfellow (c. 1879 – third ¼ 1925) was a rugby union and professional rugby league footballer who played in the 1890s through to the 1920s. He played representative level rugby union (RU) for Yorkshire, and at club level for Sharlston RFC (in Sharlston, Wakefield, later to become the rugby league club; Sharlston ARLFC), and representative level rugby league (RL) for Yorkshire, and at club level for Featherstone Rovers (who were a "Junior" club at the time), Wakefield Trinity (A-Team), Holbeck (captain), Hull FC, Dewsbury and Sharlston ARLFC (from 1910 to 1921), as a goal-kicking wing or centre.

== Background ==
Fred Goodfellow died aged 46 in Wakefield, West Riding of Yorkshire, England.

== Playing career ==
Fred Goodfellow won caps for Yorkshire (RU) against Northumberland and Lancashire during 1897, followed by further caps during 1898.

He changed rugby football codes from rugby union to rugby league, when he transferred from Sharlston RFC to Wakefield Trinity during September 1898, he did not play a first-team match for Wakefield Trinity, he was transferred from Wakefield Trinity to Holbeck c. 1899, he was the captain of Holbeck during the 1901–02 season, Holbeck resigned from the league following a 0–7 defeat by St. Helens in the Championship Second Division play-off final during the 1903–04 season, he transferred from Holbeck to Hull F.C. c. 1904, during his time at Hull F.C. he scored 11-goals in a match, he was transferred from Hull F.C. to Dewsbury c. 1906, he was transferred from Dewsbury to Sharlston ARLFC c. 1910, he retired from playing aged 41 following an injury in 1921.

== Personal life ==
Fred Goodfellow was the father of the rugby league footballer; Herbert Goodfellow.
