= New Zealand Co-operative Party =

Short lived political party in New Zealand

The New Zealand Co-operative Party or the United Liberal Co-operative Party was a short-lived political party in New Zealand. It was founded in December 1941 by anti-socialist political organiser Albert Davy after he left the People's Movement.

Davy had previously managed a number of successful political campaigns for other parties, but had frequently fallen out with his colleagues over ideological differences. The Co-operative Party was strongly rooted in Davy's strong hostility to the left-wing Labour Party, which was in government at the time. Davy soon abandoned his new party, however, and returned to the remnants of the People's Movement for the 1943 election.

The Co-operative Party never stood for election or won seats in Parliament.
