= Afghanistan Study Group =

Reviews of US foreign policy and strategy

The Afghanistan Study Group refers to several distinct initiatives aimed at reviewing United States foreign policy and strategy in the region. The most prominent version was a congressionally mandated bipartisan panel active from 2019 to 2021.

== Bipartisan panel ==
The bipartisan panel known as the Afghanistan Study Group was established by Congress in December 2019. The group was tasked with identifying policy recommendations for a peace settlement.

The group was under the United States Institute of Peace (USIP) and led by co-chairs Kelly Ayotte, a Republican politician, Joseph Dunford, former chairman of the Joint Chiefs of Staff, and Nancy Lindborg, then-president of USIP. On February 3, 2021, the group released its final report "A Pathway for Peace in Afghanistan." Its primary recommendation was for the Biden administration to extend the May 1st, 2021 withdrawal deadline set by the 2020 United States–Taliban deal.

== Other groups ==
- In late 2011, Congress approved a separate measure to create a bipartisan Afghanistan-Pakistan study group as part of the fiscal 2012 Defense spending bill. It was promoted by Rep. Frank Wolf and intended to be modeled after the Iraq Study Group. Despite congressional approval and a $1 million budget allocation, the group was opposed by the Obama administration's defense officials including Leon Panetta and Martin Dempsey, who felt such a group would be redundant and unnecessary.
- In August 2010, another group called the Afghanistan Study Group, which met in 2009 and 2010, released a report titled "A New Way Forward: Rethinking U.S. Strategy in Afghanistan." The group described itself as "an ad hoc group of public policy practitioners, former U.S. government officials, academics, business representatives, policy-concerned activists and association leaders concerned with the Obama administration’s policy course in Afghanistan and to a more limited degree, Pakistan." Notable members included Selig S. Harrison as well as Matthew Hoh (director) and Stephen Walt.
