= Douglas Goodfellow =

New Zealand businessman and philanthropist

Douglas Goodfellow OBE
- Born: William Douglas Goodfellow; 23 July 1917
- Died: 10 July 2014 (aged 96)
- Occupations: Businessman and philanthropist
- Relatives: William Goodfellow (father); Peter Goodfellow (son)

William Douglas Goodfellow OBE (23 July 1917 – 10 July 2014) was a prominent New Zealand businessman and philanthropist.

In the 1980 New Year Honours, Goodfellow was appointed an Officer of the Order of the British Empire, for services to the community. In 1994 he topped the NBR annual rich list as New Zealand's wealthiest person. In 2010, Goodfellow was inducted into the New Zealand Business Hall of Fame.
