= William Goodfellow (philanthropist) =

New Zealand businessman (1880–1974)

Sir William Goodfellow
- Born: 26 May 1880; Alexandra, Waikato, New Zealand
- Died: 5 November 1974 (aged 94); Auckland, New Zealand
- Occupations: Businessman and philanthropist
- Children: Douglas Goodfellow
- Relatives: Peter Goodfellow (grandson)

Sir William Goodfellow (26 May 1880 – 5 November 1974) was a New Zealand hardware merchant, dairying industrialist, company director and philanthropist. He was born in Alexandra, Waikato, New Zealand, on 26 May 1880.

In 1919, he founded the Waikato Dairy Co. which played a pivotal role in transforming New Zealand's dairy industry into a global powerhouse. His innovative approach to dairy production and export significantly boosted the New Zealand economy during the early 20th century.

In the 1953 Coronation Honours, Goodfellow was appointed a Knight Bachelor, for service to the dairy industry. In 1994, he was an inaugural inductee into the New Zealand Business Hall of Fame.
