= Bread and Roses Award =

British radical literary award

- Date: Annual
- Country: United Kingdom
- Presented by: Alliance of Radical Booksellers
- First award: 2012
- Website: breadandrosesprize.wordpress.com

The Bread and Roses Award for Radical Publishing is a British literary award presented for the best radical book published each year, with "radical book" defined as one that is "informed by socialist, anarchist, environmental, feminist and anti-racist concerns" – in other words, ideologically left books. The award believes itself to be the UK's only left-wing book prize. Books must be written, or largely written by authors or editors normally living in the UK, or international books available for purchase in the UK. Winning authors receive £1,000. The Bread and Roses Award is sponsored by the Alliance of Radical Booksellers and has no corporate sponsorship.

Bread and Roses is a phrase from the Bread and Roses strike of 1912 among textile workers in Lawrence, Massachusetts. In a song – "Bread and Roses" – commemorating the event, the strikers supposedly struck "for bread, and for roses too."

The inaugural prize was announced 1 May 2012, on International Workers' Day, at the Bread and Roses pub in Clapham, London.

== Winners and shortlists ==
Year	Author	Work	Result	Ref.
2012	David Graeber	Debt: The First 5,000 Years	Won	
2012	Tim Gee	Counterpower: Making Change Happen	Shortlisted	
2012	Nadia Idle and Alex Nunns (editors)	Tweets from Tahrir: Egypt's Revolution as it Unfolded, in the Words of the People Who Made It	Shortlisted	
2012	Owen Jones	Chavs: The Demonization of the Working Class	Shortlisted	
2012	Andy Merrifield	Magical Marxism	Shortlisted	
2012	Laurie Penny	Penny Red: Notes from the New Age of Dissent	Shortlisted	
2012	Nicholas Shaxson	Treasure Islands: Tax Havens and the Men who Stole the World	Shortlisted	
2013	Hsiao-Hung Pai	Scattered Sand: The Story of China's Rural Migrants	Won	
2013	Federico Campagna and Emanuele Campiglio (editors)	What We Are Fighting For: A Radical Collective Manifesto	Shortlisted	
2013	Danny Dorling	No-Nonsense Guide to Equality	Shortlisted	
2013	Donny Gluckstein	A People's History of the Second World War: Resistance Versus Empire	Shortlisted	
2013	Eveline Lubbers	Secret Manoeuvres in the Dark: Corporate and Police Spying on Activists	Shortlisted	
2013	Paul Mason	Why It's Still Kicking Off Everywhere: The New Global Revolutions	Shortlisted	
2013	Daniel Poyner (editor)	Autonomy: The Cover Designs of Anarchy 1961–1970	Shortlisted	
2013	Dan Swain	Alienation: An Introduction to Marx's Theory	Shortlisted	
2014	Joe Glenton	Soldier Box: Why I Won't Return to the War on Terror	Won	
2014	Rob Evans and Paul Lewis	Undercover: The True Story of Britain's Secret Police	Shortlisted	
2014	Oscar Guardiola-Rivera	Story of a Death Foretold: The Coup against Salvador Allende, 11 September 1973	Shortlisted	
2014	Barry Kushner and Saville Kushner	Who Needs the Cuts?: Myths of the Economic Crisis	Shortlisted	
2014	Katharine Quarmby	No Place to Call Home: Inside the Real Lives of Gypsies and Travellers	Shortlisted	
2014	Andrew Simms	Cancel the Apocalypse: The New Path to Prosperity	Shortlisted	
2014	Imogen Tyler	Revolting Subjects: Social Abjection and Resistance in Neoliberal Britain	Shortlisted	
2015	Helena Earnshaw and Angharad Penrhyn Jones	Here We Stand: Women Changing The World	Won	
2015	Ha-Joon Chang	Economics: The User's Guide	Shortlisted	
2015	Malu Halasa, Zaher Omareen, and Nawara Mahfoud	Syria Speaks: Art and Culture from the Frontline	Shortlisted	
2015	Tansy E. Hoskins	Stitched Up: The Anti-Capitalist Book of Fashion	Shortlisted	
2015	Ken Loach	The Spirit of '45	Shortlisted	
2015	Richard Seymour	The Meaning of David Cameron	Shortlisted	
2015	S. M. R. Anis	The Left Behind	Shortlisted	
2016	Jeremy Seabrook	The Song of the Shirt: The High Price of Cheap Garments, from Blackburn to Bangladesh	Won	
2016	Phil Chamberlain and Dave Smith	Blacklisted: The Secret War Between Big Business and Union Activists	Shortlisted	
2016	Kate Evans	Red Rosa: A Graphic Biography of Rosa Luxemburg	Shortlisted	
2016	Mel Evans	Artwash: Big Oil and the Arts	Shortlisted	
2016	Rhian E. Jones	Petticoat Heroes: Gender, Culture and Popular Protest in the Rebecca Riots	Shortlisted	
2016	Katrine Marçal	Who Cooked Adam Smith's Dinner? A Story About Women and Economics	Shortlisted	
2017	Alex Nunns	The Candidate: Jeremy Corbyn's Improbable Path to Power	Won	
2017	Dawn Foster	Lean Out	Shortlisted	
2017	Andrea Needham	The Hammer Blow: How 10 Women Disarmed a War Plane	Shortlisted	
2017	Lara Pawson	This is the Place to Be	Shortlisted	
2017	See Red Members & Sheila Rowbotham	See Red Women's Workshop – Feminist Posters 1974-1990	Shortlisted	
2017	Jack Shenker	The Egyptians: A Radical Story	Shortlisted	
2017	Gary Younge	Another Day in the Death of America	Shortlisted	
2018	Stuart Hall and Bill Schwarz	Familiar Stranger: A Life Between Two Islands	Won	
2018	Reni Eddo-Lodge	Why I'm No Longer Talking to White People About Race	Won	
2018	Kapka Kassabova	Border: A Journey to the Edge of Europe	Shortlisted	
2018	Heather McDaid (Editor), Laura Jones (Editor)	Nasty Women	Shortlisted	
2018	Vickie Cooper, David Whyte (editors)	The Violence of Austerity	Shortlisted	
2018	Dave Randall	Sound System: The Political Power of Music	Shortlisted	
2019	Liz Fekete	Europe's Fault Lines: Racism and the Rise of the Right	Won	
2019	Akala	Natives: Race and Class in the Ruins of Empire	Shortlisted	
2019	June Eric-Udorie (Editor)	Can We All Be Feminists?: Seventeen Writers on Intersectionality, Identity and Finding the Right Way Forward for Feminism	Shortlisted	
2019	Juno Mac and Molly Smith	Revolting Prostitutes: The Fight for Sex Workers' Rights	Shortlisted	
2019	Daniel Trilling	Lights in the Distance: Exile and Refuge at the Borders of Europe	Shortlisted	
2019	Mike Wendling	Alt Right: From 4chan to the White House	Shortlisted	
2020	Johny Pitts	Afropean: Notes from Black Europe	Won	
2020	Frances Ryan	Crippled: Austerity and the Demonization of Disabled People	Shortlisted	
2020	Becky Alexis-Martin	Disarming Doomsday: The Human Impact of Nuclear Weapons since Hiroshima	Shortlisted	
2020	Ruth Kinna	The Government of No One: The Theory and Practice of Anarchism	Shortlisted	
2020	Priyamvada Gopal	Insurgent Empire: Anticolonial Resistance and British Dissent	Shortlisted	
2020	Kate Charlesworth	Sensible Footwear: A Girl's Guide. A graphic guide to lesbian and queer history 1950-2020	Shortlisted	
2021	Ellen Clifford	The War on Disabled People: Capitalism, Welfare and the Making of a Human Catastrophe	Won	
2021	Stella Dadzie	A Kick in the Belly: Women, Slavery and Resistance	Shortlisted	
2021	Marcus Gilroy-Ware	After the Fact? The Truth About Fake News	Shortlisted	
2021	Emma Griffin	Bread Winner: An Intimate History of the Victorian Economy	Shortlisted	
2021	Owen Hatherley	Red Metropolis: Socialism and the Government of London	Shortlisted	
2021	Dan Hicks	The Brutish Museums: The Benin Bronzes, Colonial Violence and Cultural Restitution	Shortlisted	
2021	Olivette Otele	African Europeans: An Untold History	Shortlisted	
2022	Florian Grosset	The Chagos Betrayal: How Britain Robbed an Island and Made Its People Disappear	Won	
2022	Koshka Duff et al	Abolishing the Police	Shortlisted	
2022	Hsiao-Hung Pai	Ciao Ousmane: The Hidden Exploitation of Italy's Migrant Workers	Shortlisted	
2022	Gargi Bhattacharyya et al	Empire's Endgame: Racism and the British State	Shortlisted	
2022	Matthew Brown and Rhian E Jones	Paint Your Town Red	Shortlisted	
2023
2023	Aviah Day and Shanice McBean	Abolition Revolution	Won	
2023	Jeffrey Boakye	I Heard What You Said	Shortlisted	
2023	Ione Gamble	Poor Little Sick Girls	Shortlisted	
2023	Elias Jahshan (editor)	This Arab Is Queer	Shortlisted	
2023	Kojo Koram	Uncommon Wealth	Shortlisted	
2024
2024	Annabel Sowemimo	Divided: Racism, Medicine and Why We Need to Decolonise Healthcare	Won	
2024	Kaamil Ahmed	I Feel No Peace: Rohingya Fleeing Over Seas & Rivers	Shortlisted	
2024	Hil Aked	Friends of Israel: The Backlash Against Palestine Solidarity	Shortlisted	
2024	Robert Chapman	Empire of Normality: Neurodiversity and Capitalism	Shortlisted	
2024	Danny Dorling	Shattered Nation: Inequality and the Geography of A Failing State	Shortlisted	
2024	Malu Halasa	Woman Life Freedom: Voices and Art from the Women’s Protests in Iran	Shortlisted	
2025
2025	Skye Arundhati Thomas and Izabella Scott	Pleasure Gardens: Blackouts and the Logic of Crisis in Kashmir	Won	
2025	Marianne Brooker	Intervals	Won	
2025	Janet Alder and Dan Glazebrook	Defiance: Racial Injustice, Police Brutality, A Sister’s Fight for the Truth	Shortlisted	
2025	Marijam Did	Everything to Play For: How Videogames are Changing the World	Shortlisted	
2025	Gabrielle de la Puente and Zarina Muhammad	Poor Artists	Shortlisted	
2025	Kalwant Bhopal	Race and Education: Reproducing White Supremacy in Britain	Shortlisted	
2025	Danny Dorling	Seven Children: Inequality and Britain’s Next Generation	Shortlisted	
2025	Jake Hall	Shoulder to Shoulder: A Queer History of Solidarity, Coalition and Chaos	Shortlisted	
