= Lenthall =

Lenthall may refer to:

- Lenthall Houses, historic houses on the George Washington University campus in Washington, D.C.
- Lenthalls Dam, a dam in Queensland, Australia
- USNS John Lenthall (T-AO-189), a United States Navy fleet replenishment oiler in service since 1987
- Lenthall Road Workshop (1975–1990), feminist artist collective in London, England

== People with the surname ==
- John Lenthall (shipbuilder) (1807-1882), American naval architect and shipbuilder
- Sir John Lenthall, 1st Baronet (1624/5–1681), English lawyer and member of parliament
- William Lenthall (1591-1662), English politician who served as Speaker of the House of Commons
