= Tim Gee =

- Church: Religious Society of Friends
- Predecessor: Gretchen Castle

Personal details
- Born: Stockport, United Kingdom
- Denomination: Quaker
- Education: University of Edinburgh

Tim Gee is the general secretary of Friends World Committee for Consultation, the international organisation of Quakers worldwide. He is also a writer and faith-based activist in the United Kingdom, who popularised the concept of counterpower, and has written about pacifism and the Occupy movement.

== Personal life ==
=== Early life ===
Gee was born in Stockport, United Kingdom in the mid-1980s.

=== Education ===
Gee attended Aquinas College, Stockport, a Roman Catholic sixth form college in Stockport, United Kingdom. During this time he was actively involved in the campaign against the Iraq War.

He went on to study politics at the University of Edinburgh where he graduated with an MA degree in 2009 While at the university he was a part of its People and Planet group, promoting Fairtrade, and was elected the Vice President (Services) of the Edinburgh University Students Association. In 2005 he was elected to the Board of Directors of NUS Services Ltd.

== Writing career ==
Gee's first book, Counterpower: Making Change Happen was published in 2011, in which he puts forward a theory of how governments and elite groups exercise power, and argues that others can use counterpower to counter this. He puts forward a model in which this counterpower is splits into three categories: idea counterpower, economic counterpower, and physical counterpower. Counterpower was shortlisted for the Bread and Roses Award in 2012.

His second book, You Can't Evict an Idea: What Can We Learn From Occupy? was published in 2013 as an e-book and in physical form.

His third book is Why I am a Pacifist, published by the Christian Alternative imprint from John Hunt publishers.

Gee has also published in the New Internationalist, Scottish Left Review and writes a blog for The Guardian

Gee was amongst a group of prominent authors and writers who campaigned against a ban on sending books to prisoners in the United Kingdom

Gee documented the buildup to the eviction of the Calais Jungle refugee camp in 2016 for The Tablet, as the Writer in Residence at the Maria Skobtsova Catholic Worker House.

== Political experience ==
=== Student politics ===
Gee was the Vice President Services (VPS) of Edinburgh University Students Association. He sat on the board of the National Union of Students' commercial arm, NUSSL. He seconded a motion for the University of Edinburgh to revoke the honorary degree it had bestowed on Robert Mugabe, and was involved in the campaign for the university to become a Fairtrade University.

=== Superglue Three ===
In 2010, Gee was part of a group, dubbed The Superglue Three, accused of committing a breach of the peace at a branch of the Royal Bank of Scotland in Edinburgh by gluing themselves to each other and the entrance door of the premises. Gee was admonished of a breach of the peace, with no financial penalty

In a statement originally published in The Scotsman, Gee linked his action with the Royal Bank of Scotland's financing of tar sands extraction in Alberta, Canada, and stated that as 84% of the Royal Bank of Scotland was at that time publicly owned, UK tax payers should have a say in what projects are funded. Responding to this, Andrew Cave, Head of Group Sustainability at the Royal Bank of Scotland, said that he and Gee agreed on a number of points, including that the Royal Bank of Scotland needs to be more accountable and that society should transition to a low-carbon economy: however he said they disagreed on how this should happen.

=== Bond (British Overseas NGOs for Development) ===
Gee worked for Bond (for international development) as Campaigns Communications Officer, co-ordinating the 2009 Put People First campaign and 2008 Stand Up and Take Action against Poverty and Inequality campaign.

=== Faith-based campaigning on climate action ===
In 2015, moving from political campaigning to faith-based activism, Gee was the Campaign Strategy Lead at the UK Christian development organisation, Christian Aid, where he was part of the faith-based organising team working together with Muslims and Jews for action on climate change.

In 2016, Gee led the Big Church Switch, encouraging British churches to switch to a renewable energy provider.

== Religious views ==
Gee is a Quaker, and in 2011 appeared on a poster advertising the Religious Society of Friends (Quakers) in Britain. Gee delivered prepared ministry on the subject of "movement building" to Britain Yearly Meeting, the national annual meeting of Quakers in Britain, in 2016. Gee built on this further when he was invited by the George Gorman Memorial Fund to deliver the George Gorman Lecture at Britain Yearly Meeting in 2017, exploring themes of power, diversity, and the spiritual root of political action within the Religious Society of Friends. He has been involved in promoting Britain Yearly Meeting's Sanctuary Everywhere programme in response to forced migration.

== Bibliography ==
=== Books ===
Gee, T (2011) Counterpower: making change happen New Internationalist Publishing: Oxford, UK

Gee, T (2013) You can't evict an idea: What can we learn from Occupy? Housmans: London, UK

Gee, T (2019) Why I am a Pacifist: A call for a more nonviolent world. John Hunt: London, UK

Gee, T (2022) "Open for Liberation - an activist reads the bible"

=== Chapters ===
Gee, T (2012) The children of the children of the revolution. In: Coatman, C. & Shrubsole, G. [Ed] Regeneration Lawrence & Wisehart: London, UK 109-116

=== Articles ===
Gee, T (2008) Is Poverty History Yet? Scottish Left Review (47) 20-21

Gee, T (2008) Will Red and Green Ever be Seen? Scottish Left Review (46) 18-19

Gee, T (2013) You cannot be free if you are poor Peace News (2562)

Gee, T (2013) The battle for Mandela's legacy is only beginning The Independent 3 July 2013

Gee, T (2014) Yasuni: a cautionary tale New Internationalist (471) 38-40

=== Lectures ===
The 2025 Backhouse Lecture: The seed is in all: A journey through the Quaker world. (Melbourne, Australia)

=== Film ===
Tim produced the film "Marikana's Precious Metal", a 2018 film marking the sixth anniversary of the South African Marikana massacre, when striking mine workers were fired on by security forces. Seventeen workers died.
