= Queen Elizabeth II: Her Story, Our Century =

2026 British television programme

- Genre: Documentary film
- Directed by: Rosie Schellenberg
- Country of origin: United Kingdom
- Original language: English

Production
- Executive producer: Dominique Walker
- Producers: Rosie Schellenberg; Emily Dance
- Editors: Rick Barker; Gareth Davies
- Running time: 58 minutes
- Production company: BBC Studios

Original release
- Network: BBC One
- Release: 19 April 2026

Queen Elizabeth II: Her Story, Our Century is a 2026 television documentary film about Queen Elizabeth II, released to mark the centenary of her birth. The film was broadcast on BBC One and BBC iPlayer on 19 April 2026. The documentary features footage and contents from various archives as well as contributions from Queen Camilla, Dame Helen Mirren, Barack Obama, Sir Tony Blair, Sir David Attenborough, Dame Sheila Hancock, Lady Anne Glenconner, Sir Tom Jones, Jill Scott, Peter Phillips, and Gyles Brandreth who shared their memories of the Queen.

== Reception ==
Writing for The Times, Carol Midgley gave the documentary three out of five stars and felt it was too short, commenting: "Given the length and sheer eventfulness of her life, Queen Elizabeth II: Her Story, Our Century did feel a bit whistlestop, some might even say perfunctory" but added "there is potency in brevity and this was still a quality film". In a less favorable review for The Guardian, Frances Ryan gave the documentary one out of five stars and argued: "There were two documentaries about the queen that the BBC could have made. One, a nuanced exploration of her reign and British history that respects its audience. Two, a hagiography aimed at Daily Mail readers. Commissioners chose the second option".
