= Protests against the war in Afghanistan =

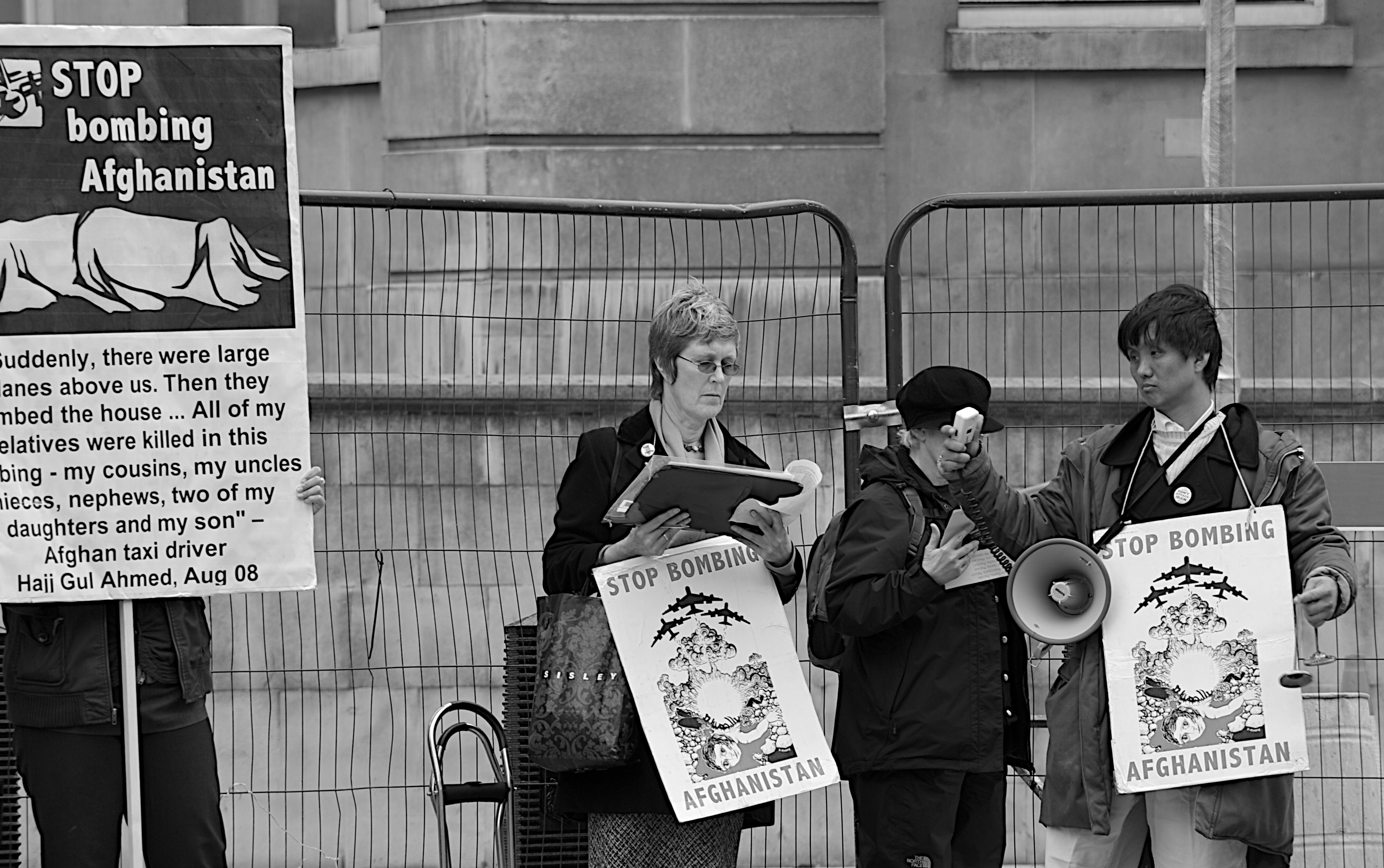
A protest opposite Downing Street in October 2008

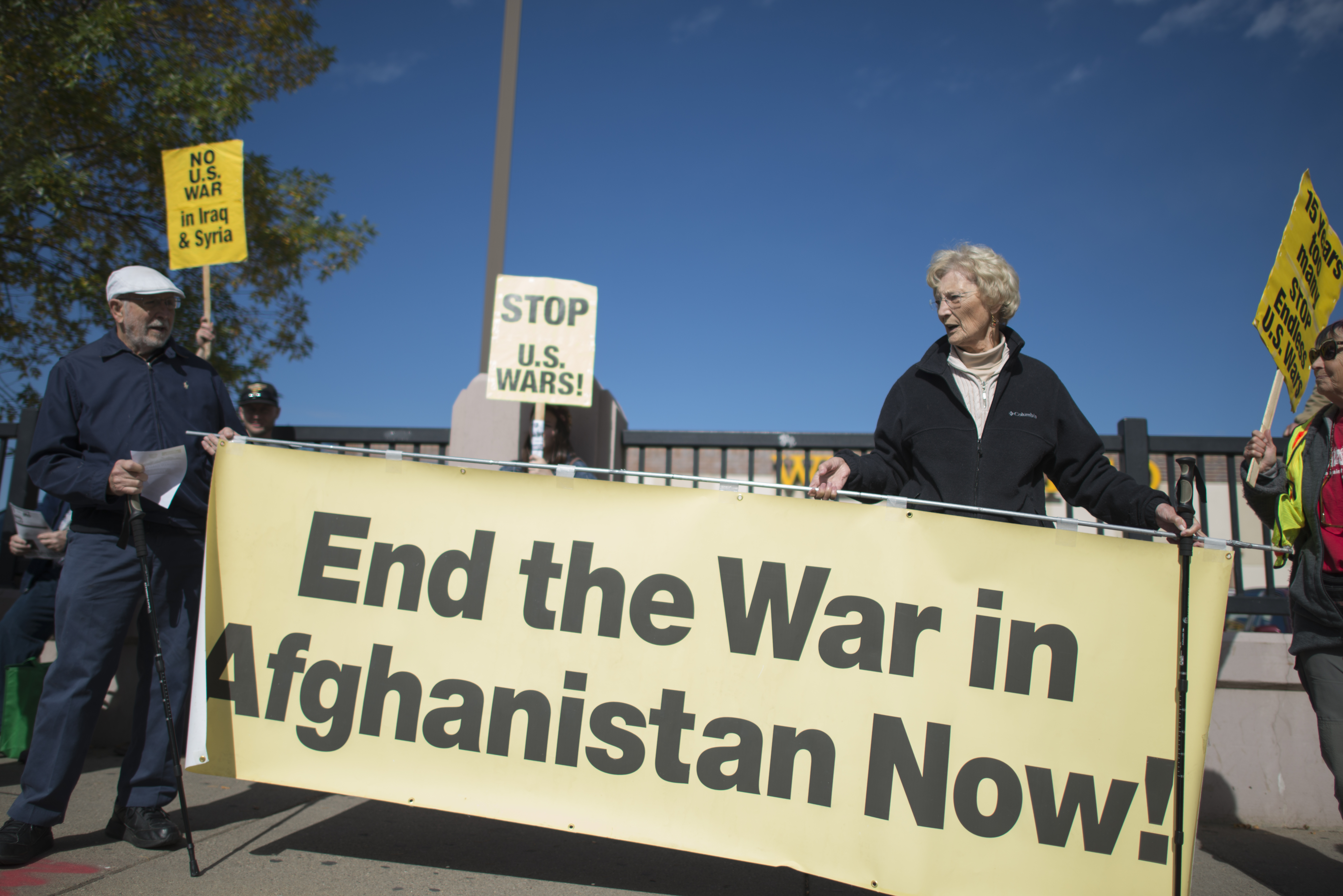
Protest against U.S military interventions and endless U.S. wars in Minneapolis, Minnesota, in October 2016

The proposed invasion of Afghanistan prompted protests with mass demonstrations in the days leading up to the official launch of the war on October 7, 2001. The continuation of the war in Afghanistan from 2001 to 2021 led to further protest and opposition to hostilities.

== 2001 ==
On September 29, 2001, as many as 20,000 people demonstrated in Washington, D.C., United States, denouncing the impending United States invasion of Afghanistan. The protests were organized by the recently formed A.N.S.W.E.R. coalition. Thousands of protesters gathered at Meridian Hill Park (Malcolm X Park) and marched downtown, while elsewhere members of the Anti-Capitalist Convergence clashed briefly with police on their way to Edward R. Murrow Park, across from the headquarters of the World Bank and the IMF. Both groups of marchers converged on a rally at the Freedom Plaza.

In San Francisco almost 10,000 people converged on a park in San Francisco's Mission District to denounce the Bush administration's plans for military intervention in Afghanistan.

In Los Angeles roughly 2,500 protesters marched through the streets of Westwood.

In New York City 3,000 to 5,000 people took part in a peace march at Union Square.

In Barcelona, Spain, 5,000 people attended a rally and marched behind a banner that read: "No More Victims – For Peace." The protesters urged the Spanish government not to support any US military intervention or NATO retaliation.

On October 1, 2001, several thousand protesters demonstrated in New York City against any military offensive in response to the September 11 attacks in New York and near Washington. Sporting buttons that said "Don't Turn Tragedy into War" and "Our Grief Is Not a Cry for War", many protesters argued that the attacks were not an act of war but a criminal act to be dealt with through the international justice system.

On October 7, 2001, 10,000 to 12,000 people turned out in New York City to oppose the Bush administration's so-called war on terror. The group marched from Union Square to Times Square, cheering the police at the beginning of the march. The list of about twelve speakers was cut to three or four by the police, and they were herded at the end into a one-lane-wide "bullpen".

On October 13, 2001, more than 20,000 people joined the UK's biggest protest yet against military action in Afghanistan by the United States and its allies. Turn-out was twice as big as had been expected by organisers, with the noisy but peaceful march through London culminating in a rally at Trafalgar Square.

In Glasgow, Scotland, United Kingdom, around 1,500 people gathered in George Square for a rally against the military action in Afghanistan.

In Germany more than 25,000 protesters took to the streets in cities across the country. In Berlin, the largest demonstration drew 15,000 people to the central square in a rally that followed several marches throughout the city under the banner "No war – stand up for peace".

In Sweden the biggest demonstration took place in Gothenburg, where more than 2,500 people marched through the city.

In San Francisco 10,000 people took to the streets, while a rally in Washington Square in New York City attracted some 700 people.

In Australia, thousands of people demonstrated in the cities of Sydney, Melbourne, Perth and Adelaide.

On October 14, 2001, hundreds of thousands of peace protesters in Italy and India called for an end to the bombing of Afghanistan. More than 200,000 demonstrators took part in the peace march from the central Italian town of Perugia to Assisi, with protesters shouting "Stop the terrorism against Afghanistan", "We want peace not war", and chanting slogans attacking George W. Bush, the U.S. president.

In India, 70,000 people in Calcutta staged the biggest anti-war protest the country had ever seen. The protesters marched more than 7.5 miles through the city, entertained by performers who sang anti-war folk songs.

On November 10, 2001, after weeks of bombing, hundreds of protesters took to the streets across the United Kingdom to call for an end to the bombing of Afghanistan. In Bolton 250 people gathered in the town's Victoria Square. In York, about 200 protesters called for an end to the war during a two-hour demonstration. A vigil was held in London.

On November 18, 2001, thousands – police estimated 15,000, organizers estimated 100,000 – from all over the UK took part in a march in London to demonstrate again against the war in Afghanistan.

Many protesters waved placards reading "Stop the War" and "Not in My Name". As the demonstration fell during Ramadan, an element of prayer was included in the final rally to allow pious Muslims to observe their faith. Headlining speakers included human rights campaigner Bianca Jagger, Labour Party veteran Tony Benn, Labour MP George Galloway, and speakers of Muslim faith.

Member of Parliament Paul Marsden told the rally: !

You are sending another powerful message to Number 10 and to the White House that we are not simply going to allow the atrocities of September 11 to be replaced with further atrocities in Afghanistan.

Organiser Lindsey German said the bombing campaign had done nothing to tackle international terrorism.

The war aims were never to install the Northern Alliance into Afghanistan to replace the Taleban. Most people who know anything about both regimes regard the Northern Alliance as just as bad.

At the time the protest was the largest peace demonstration in more than twenty years.

== 2002 ==
On April 20, 2002, 75,000 people marched in Washington, D.C. against U.S. militarism and foreign policy in the largest peace presence since the war began the previous fall. The April 20th Mobilization to Stop the War, a coalition of many groups, held a rally just south of the Washington Monument. Another protest focusing on Israeli aggression against the Palestinian people was held near the White House, while a third protest focusing on the policies of the World Bank and the International Monetary Fund took place near the headquarters of those institutions. The three rallies then converged together in a march up Pennsylvania Avenue to the United States Capitol in the largest anti-war demonstration to take place in Washington since the Gulf War more than a decade ago.

Protesters denounced the bombing of Afghan civilians and carried signs and banners reading, "No blank check for endless war," "Criminals in the White House again" and "War without an end. Not in our name."

Some of the most moving speeches opposing the U.S.'s aggression were given by family members of victims of the terrorist attacks on September 11. Derril Bodley, who lost a daughter on September 11, said he had travelled to Afghanistan to call for an end to the "barbarous bombing campaign there." Just a few days after his daughter's death he spoke out against the possibility of war, saying, "Don't kill more innocent people in the name of my daughter." He said thousands were suffering and dying by the "perpetration of an aimless war."

Another speaker, Michael Ratner, a human rights lawyer and president of the Center for Constitutional Rights, denounced the conditions in which hundreds of prisoners captured in Afghanistan were being held at the U.S.'s military base in Guantanamo Bay, Cuba:

There are 300 people there right now, in dog cages, surrounded by chain-linked fences, in temperatures of over 100 degrees, infested by vermin in a desert in Cuba. We went to an international court, and the Organization of American States says this is illegal. The US says: 'We don't care.'

Another 15,000 to 20,000 people marched in San Francisco in a simultaneous protest on the West Coast, and demonstrations also took place in a number of other American cities.

== 2005 ==
On August 17, 2005, over 1,000 people took part in a vigil in Minneapolis-Saint Paul to protest the wars in Afghanistan and Iraq. Organizers estimated the number at 1,200.

== 2006 ==
On September 23, 2006, tens of thousands of people marched in Manchester, UK, against the presence of UK troops in Iraq and Afghanistan. Organizers estimated that about 30,000 people participated. Police put the figure at about 20,000. Speakers at a rally accused Prime Minister Tony Blair of following the United States into illegal wars in Iraq and Afghanistan.

On Saturday, October 28, 2006, thousands of protesters opposed to Canada's participation in the war in Afghanistan rallied in 40 cities and towns. Under the slogan "Support our troops, bring 'em home", as many as 500 demonstrators marched through downtown Ottawa to Parliament Hill to protest the military mission and demand the return of Canadian troops. Hundreds of protesters in Toronto and Montreal, 200 in Halifax, 100 in Edmonton, more than a 100 in Calgary, and more than 500 in Vancouver also took to the streets. Themes of the demonstrations included demands that the troops be brought home from Afghanistan and demands that the mission of the Canadian Forces in that country shift from a combat role to a peace keeping and humanitarian presence. Placards expressed such sentiments as "Build Homes Not Bombs," "Drop Tuition Not Bombs" and "Is This Really Peacekeeping". A total of 42 Canadian soldiers and one diplomat had so far been killed in Afghanistan.

Thousands of Pakistani tribesmen near the border with Afghanistan held a rally to protest against a missile attack that killed 80 people. About 5,000 tribesman held a protest march in Khar, the capital town of Bajaur tribal district, some 10 km south-east of the scene of the attack. The tribesmen said the dead, housed in a seminary, were merely students and that their families should be compensated. The effigies of U.S. president George Bush and Pakistani president Pervez Musharraf were paraded on mules before being set on fire. Since the U.S. air-strike on the school, thousands of local people have taken part in protests against Islamabad's alliance with the US.

== 2007 ==
On February 23, 2007, hundreds of Canadians braved wind, rain, and snow to take part in rallies in cities across Canada to protest their country's military operation in Afghanistan, urging their government to bring Canadian troops home. In Vancouver, about 600 people rallied and marched through the downtown core. In Toronto, hundreds of protesters held a rally outside the U.S. consulate. Nearly 500 people marched through downtown Montreal. About 200 people gathered in front of city hall in Halifax. Demonstrations also took place in Edmonton, Quebec City, and St. John's, Newfoundland.

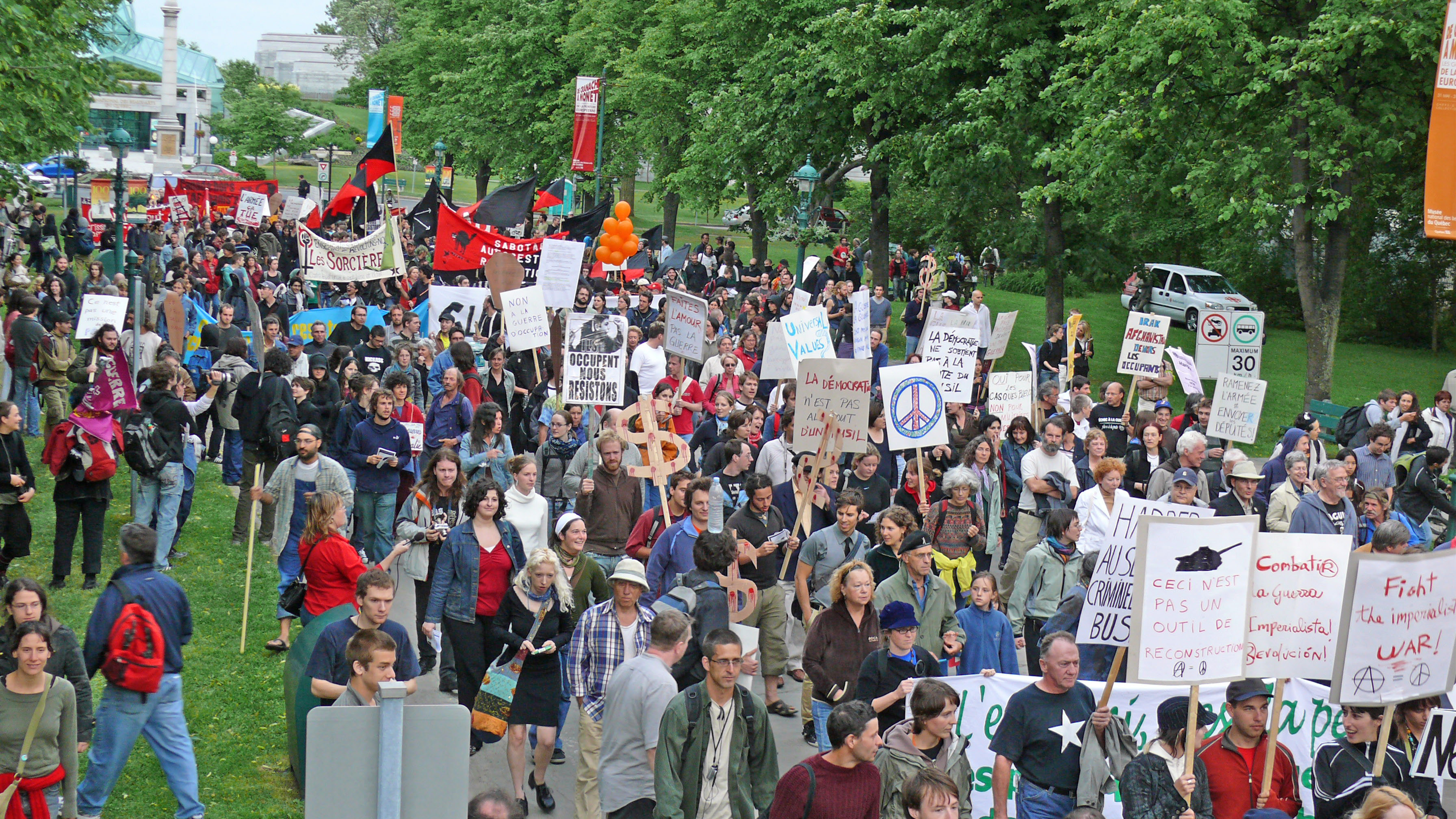
June 22, 2007 protest in Quebec City against Canada's involvement in the Afghan war.

On April 30, 2007, thousands of Afghans staged a protest accusing U.S.-led coalition and Afghan troops of killing civilians in the western province of Herat. The protesters stormed a government district headquarters in Shindand, south of Herat city, where Western troops have a large base. The anti-U.S. protest came a day after an angry demonstration in eastern Nangahar province over the killing of civilians by coalition and Afghan forces there.

On June 22, 2007, protesters in Quebec City took part in a march to denounce the Canadian military involvement in Afghanistan and the deployment of additional troops to Kandahar province.

On Saturday October 27, 2007, rallies took place in 22 different Canadian cities to protest against the Canadian military mission in Afghanistan. In Montreal, around 300 protesters marched despite heavy rain, while protests in Toronto and Ottawa numbered around 200. At the time, 70 Canadian soldiers and one diplomat had been killed in Afghanistan.

== 2008 ==
On March 15, 2008, thousands of protesters gathered in London and Glasgow to call for the withdrawal of UK troops from Iraq and Afghanistan. Police said there were 10,000 people on the streets in London but organizers put the crowds at between 30,000 and 40,000. In Glasgow, there 1,000 to 1,500 people took part in the march, according to police estimates.

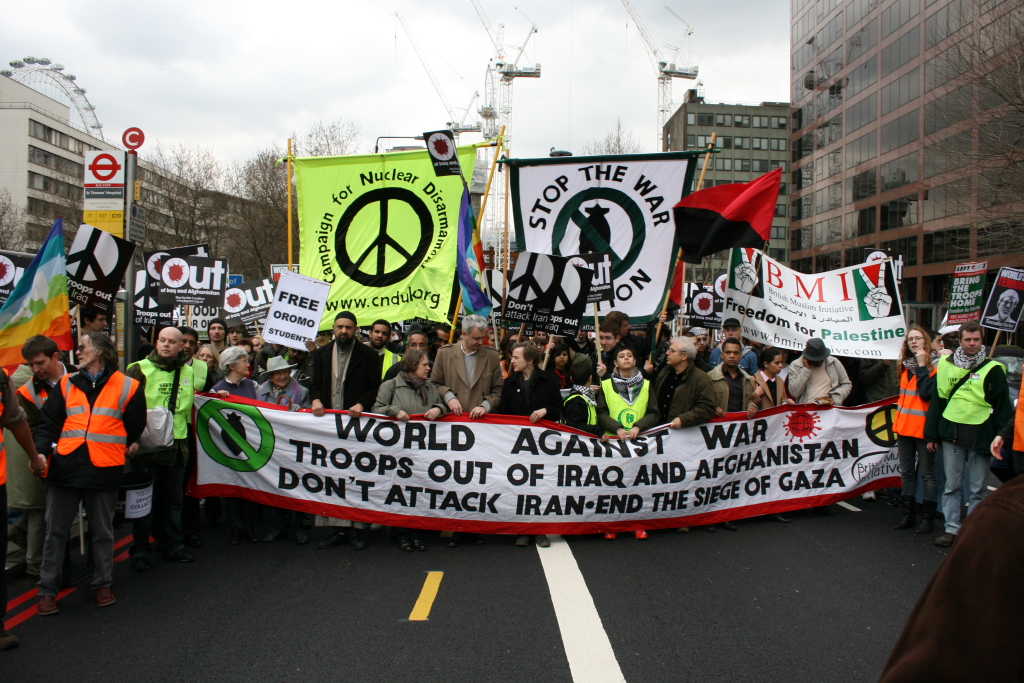
Stop the War Coalition protest march on March 15, 2008 in London

On September 20, 2008, thousands of people in France and Germany took to the streets calling for soldiers deployed in Afghanistan to be brought home. More than 5,000 people took to the streets in the German cities of Berlin and Stuttgart to protest against the decision to prolong the deployment of German troops in Afghanistan. According to police estimates, over 3,300 people in Berlin, and over 2,000 people in Stuttgart took part in the rallies, while event organizers put the total figure at 7,000 people.

In France, marches took place in about 10 cities. Around 3,000 people took part in the largest march in Paris. At the time of the protests, around 30 German troops and 24 French troops had been killed in Afghanistan.

In the United Kingdom thousands of anti-war demonstrators staged a noisy protest in Manchester to deliver an anti-war message to the government. Over 5,000 people joined in the march to call for the withdrawal of British troops from Afghanistan and Iraq. At the time, 120 British soldiers had died in Afghanistan, and 176 had died in Iraq.

On Saturday, October 18, 2008, hundreds of Canadians marched in rallies held in 16 different cities across Canada to protest the country's military involvement in Afghanistan. In Toronto, more than 300 people gathered at Queen's Park to send Prime Minister Stephen Harper a clear message: Bring our troops home, now. In Montreal, hundreds of people turned out to demand Canadian troops be brought home and to shine a light on the dollars-and-cents costs of a growing defence establishment. In Ottawa, around 150 people marched at a rally on Parliament Hill demanding that Prime Minister Stephen Harper bring the troops home. A total of 97 Canadian soldiers and one diplomat had so far been killed in Afghanistan.

On December 18, 2008, more than 10,000 people in Pakistan protested their government's logistical support for U.S. and NATO military operations in Afghanistan and demanded an end to U.S. missile strikes into Pakistan along the Afghan border. In Peshawar, up to 5,000 people joined the protest as they marched in the streets of the city.

On December 20, 2008, Canadians in Montreal and Toronto threw shoes at posters of George Bush in front of their respective U.S. consulates during protests against the U.S. military occupations of Iraq and Afghanistan, and against Canada's involvement in the U.S.-led war in Afghanistan.

== 2009 ==
On March 20, 2009, in the first large demonstration in Washington, D.C. since Barack Obama became president, thousands of Americans, some bearing mock coffins to protest war casualties, took the streets on the sixth anniversary of the 2003 Iraq invasion to protest the wars in Iraq and Afghanistan.

More than 10,000 people marched on the Pentagon. Led by a contingent of Afghanistan and Iraq war veterans, the protesters proceeded on to the headquarters of major military-industrial corporations such as Boeing, Lockheed Martin, General Dynamics, and KBR, corporations that the demonstrators characterized as "merchants of death" and to which they sought to deliver symbolic coffins.

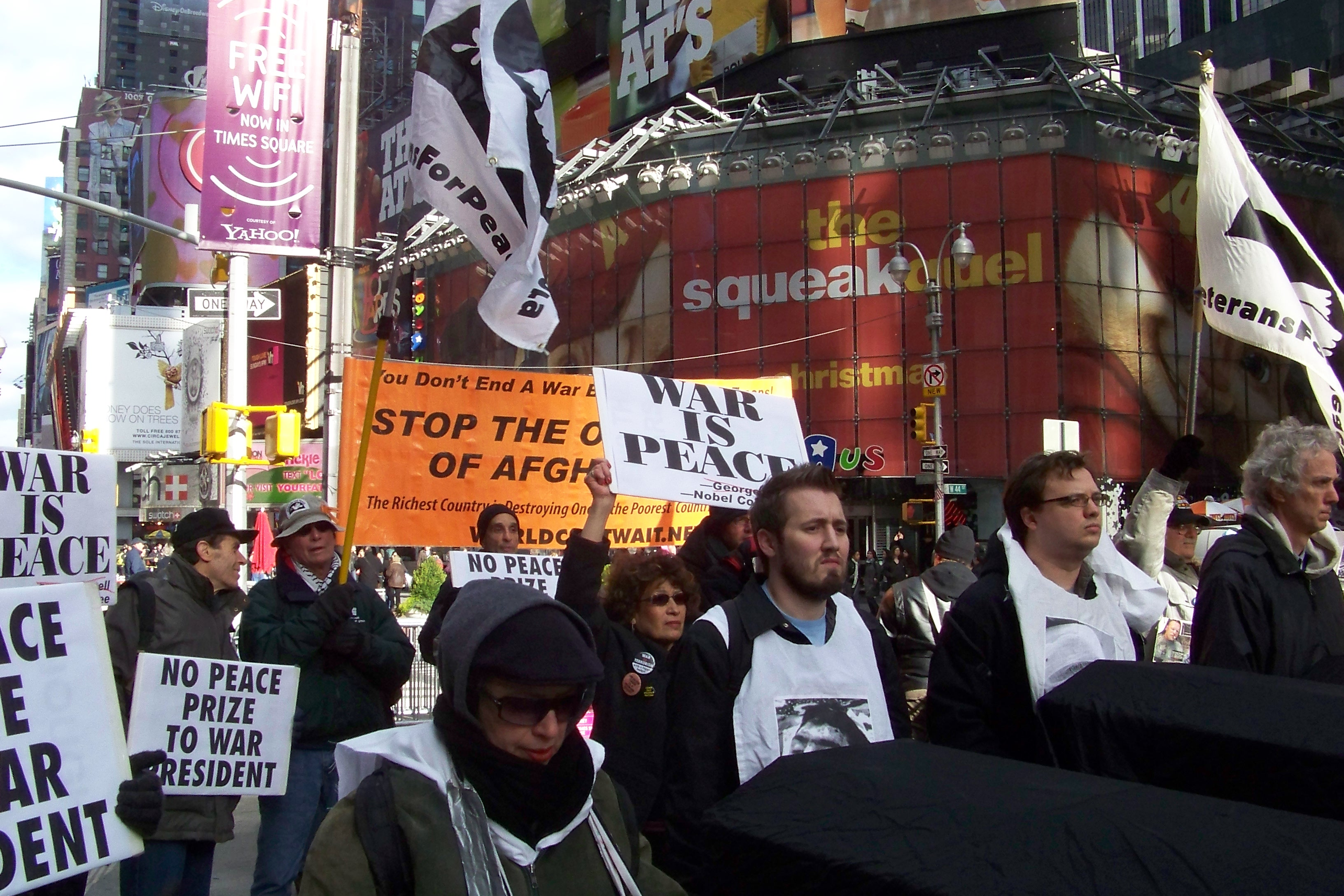
Protest against the war in Afghanistan in New York City, December 10, 2009

In Los Angeles, thousands marched down Hollywood Boulevard to call for all U.S. troops to be brought home. A 4,000-strong crowd took part in the "Stop the Wars" march and rally.

Another 4,000 people demonstrated in San Francisco. Rallies against the wars similarly took place in New York City, San Diego, Saint Paul, Minneapolis, and other American cities.

On March 28, 2009, up to 15,000 protesters marched through central London to demonstrate ahead of the G20 summit of world leaders. The Put People First march, organized by an alliance of more than 150 anti-war, environment, charity, labour, student, faith, and development groups, included calls for Western troops to pull out of Afghanistan and protesters chanting "What do we want? Jobs not bombs."

On October 7, 2009, Students for a Democratic Society called a national day of action against the war in Afghanistan. Over 25 chapters of SDS planned and held various actions around the country. A "Funk the War" march led by Rochester SDS was forcibly ended by the police, with 12 of the 60 marchers arrested and later released or bailed out.

On the weekend of October 17–18, 2009, anti-war protests took place in 50 cities across the United States. In Boston, hundreds of protesters gathered at Copley Square to protest the war in Afghanistan, Pakistan, and Iraq. Zoya, a 28-year-old Afghan woman spoke against the U.S.-led war in her country, saying her homeland does not need more foreign occupation. Suzette Abbot, carrying a sign that read "Yes We Can Get Out of Afghanistan", said "Obama needs to make good on his promises. We all worked to get him elected. Now he needs to earn that peace prize."

In Minneapolis, 400 people marched, calling for an end to the U.S. war in Afghanistan and an end to the continued U.S. occupation of Iraq.

The organizers in Minneapolis stated:

President Obama is reported to be listening to the generals about the next steps in Afghanistan; he should be listening to the people, who want an end to the war. During the worst economic crisis since the Great Depression, the U.S. government is spending billions for wars and occupations, while millions lose their jobs and housing and go without health insurance.

On October 24, 2009, more than 10,000 people marched through the streets of London in protest against the war, which they said is a futile and unwinnable conflict. Protesters called for the withdrawal of British troops from Afghanistan, gathering first at Speakers Corner, Hyde Park, before marching to Trafalgar Square. The number of British soldiers killed in the eight-year-long war was 222 at the time of the protest.

Lance Cpl. Joe Glenton defied orders from his commanding officer to become the first serving soldier to openly attend a national anti-war demonstration. He stated:

When I went to Afghanistan I was proud to serve the Army and to serve my country, but before long I realised the government as using the Army for its own ends. It is distressing to disobey orders, but when Britain follows America in continuing to wage war against one of the world's poorest countries I feel I have no choice.

On Saturday, November 14, 2009, around 1,000 people demonstrated against the war as NATO's parliamentary met in Edinburgh, Scotland while at the same time a poll showed that the majority 71% of Britons want British military forces withdrawn from Afghanistan within 12 months.

On the same day, about 200 South Koreans in Seoul protested their government's plan to send troops to Afghanistan. Lee Jung-hee, a lawmaker with the opposition Democratic Labor Party said: "We should not fall into the swamp of the U.S. anti-terror war."

== 2010 ==
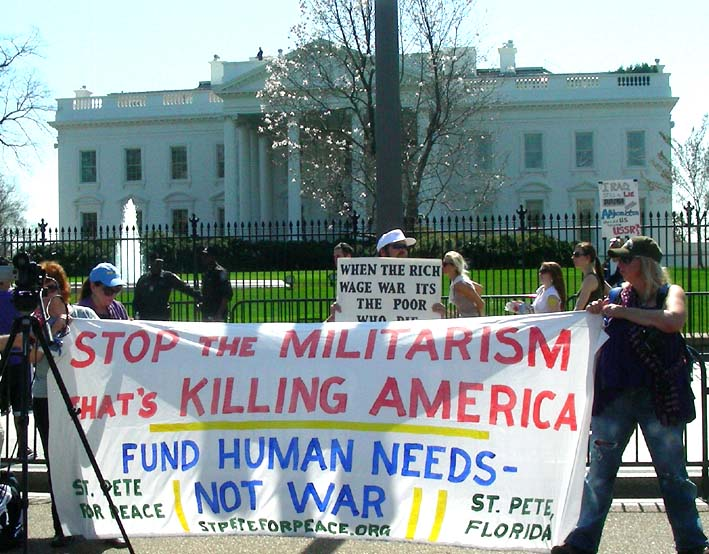
Anti-war protest in Washington, D.C., March 20, 2010

On Saturday, March 20, 2010, an estimated 10,000 demonstrators marched through downtown Washington, D.C. to protest the U.S.-led invasions and wars in Iraq and Afghanistan. The crowd, stretching about four blocks long, started at Lafayette Square, stopping in front of Halliburton's offices and the Mortgage Bankers Association's building, and ended at the White House. Protesters contrasted the financial funding of the two American wars to the lack of money for health care, job growth, and cash-strapped local governments and school systems. Protest signs included "Healthcare not warfare" and "Drop tuition, not bombs", and marchers shouted:

Money for jobs and education, not more war and occupation!

On Saturday November 20, 2010, protesters led by military families held a 10,000-strong demonstration march through London against the war in Afghanistan.

On the same day NATO announced that it had signed a deal with Afghan president Hamid Karzai to ensure NATO's long-term military presence in that country even after it formally ends combat operations, ostensibly in 2015, conditions permitting, when its troops would then shift to training Afghan combat forces. A senior U.S. official, however, stated that some combat troops would remain beyond that time.

At the NATO military summit in Lisbon, British prime minister David Cameron promised that the withdrawal of British combat troops from Afghanistan by 2015 was a "firm deadline" that would be met.

A speaker at the demonstration, Seumas Milne, a commentator for the Guardian, told the crowd that NATO's announcement of its goal to withdraw combat-involved troops in five years time was "a sham" and pointed out:

They're stating that their aim is to withdraw combat troops by 2015. Even if they achieve that, the period from now until then will be as long as the first World War.

The executive director of War on Want, John Hilary, also decried the diversion of British taxpayer money from needs at home to warfare in Afghanistan:

We want the £11bn that is being spent on the war in Afghanistan to go on things we need in this country. Bring home the troops and bring justice to the people of Afghanistan.

At the time of the protest against the war, the number of British soldiers killed by the war since 2001 stood at 345.

== 2011 ==
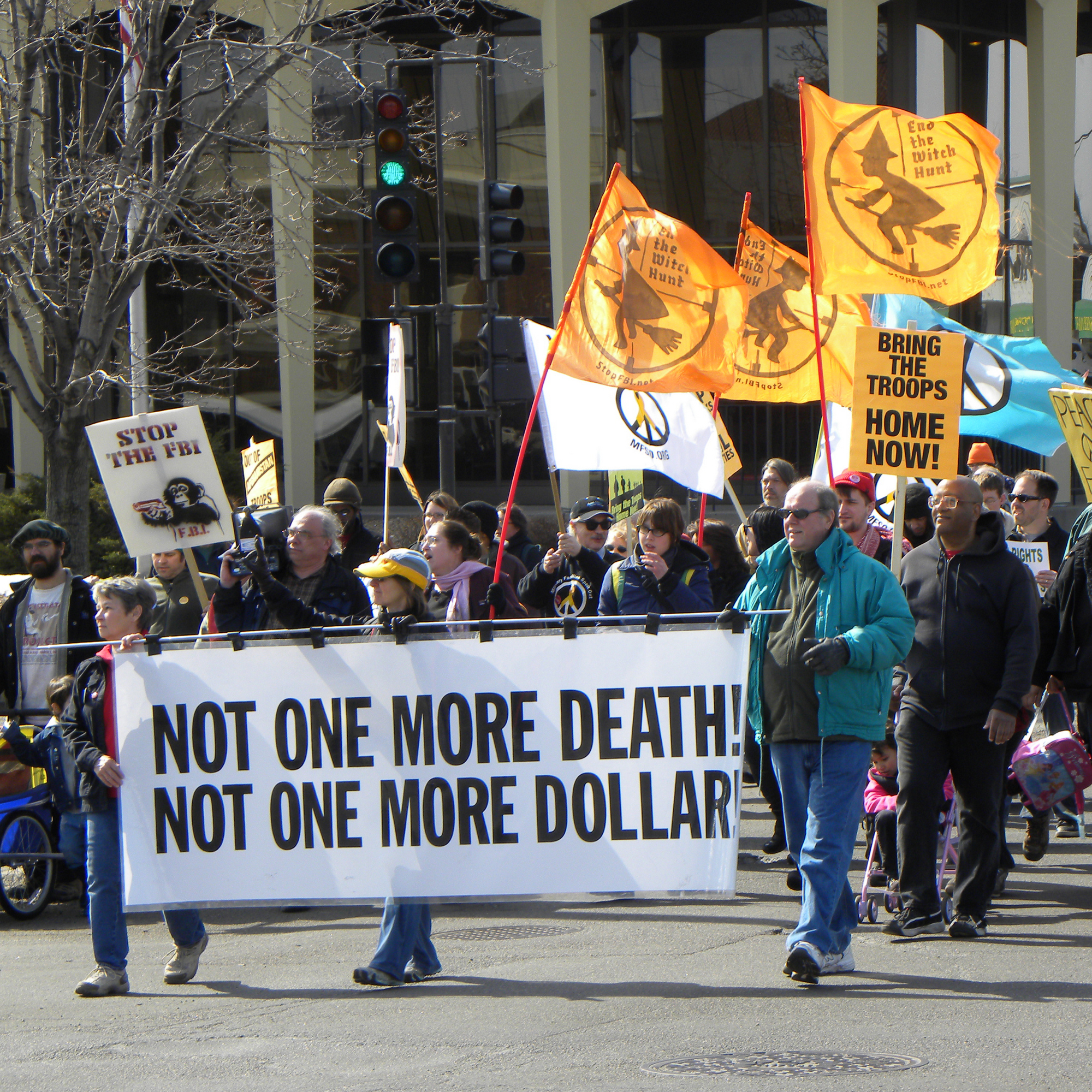
Anti-war march in St. Paul, Minnesota, March 19, 2011

On February 12, 2011, the British newspaper The Guardian published a letter from the NGO War on Want and others, asking its readers to email the word "Yes" to register that they want their country to withdraw its troops from Afghanistan.

On October 7, 2011, the 10th anniversary of the U.S.-led invasion of Afghanistan, over 200 protesters demonstrated outside the White House, denouncing the war, carrying model drones, and demanding an immediate pullout of the Western military forces from that country.

Hundreds of American war veterans and their families and anti-war protesters marched to Martin Luther King Jr. Memorial in Washington, D.C., carrying signs saying "Fund jobs, not war!" and "Wars are poor chisels for peaceful tomorrows." Speakers included three women from Afghanistan representing the group "Afghans for Peace".

Ten long years that we have engaged in war, dropping bombs, killing people, spending trillions of dollars.

We are not listening to Dr. King's words.

— United for Peace and Justice, October 7, 2011

In Los Angeles, around 100 people marched downtown to call for an end to the war in Afghanistan on its 10th anniversary. The demonstration started with a prayer service at a church followed by a march to a civic center federal building. 14 peace activists were arrested by authorities for blocking traffic in planned civil disobedience.

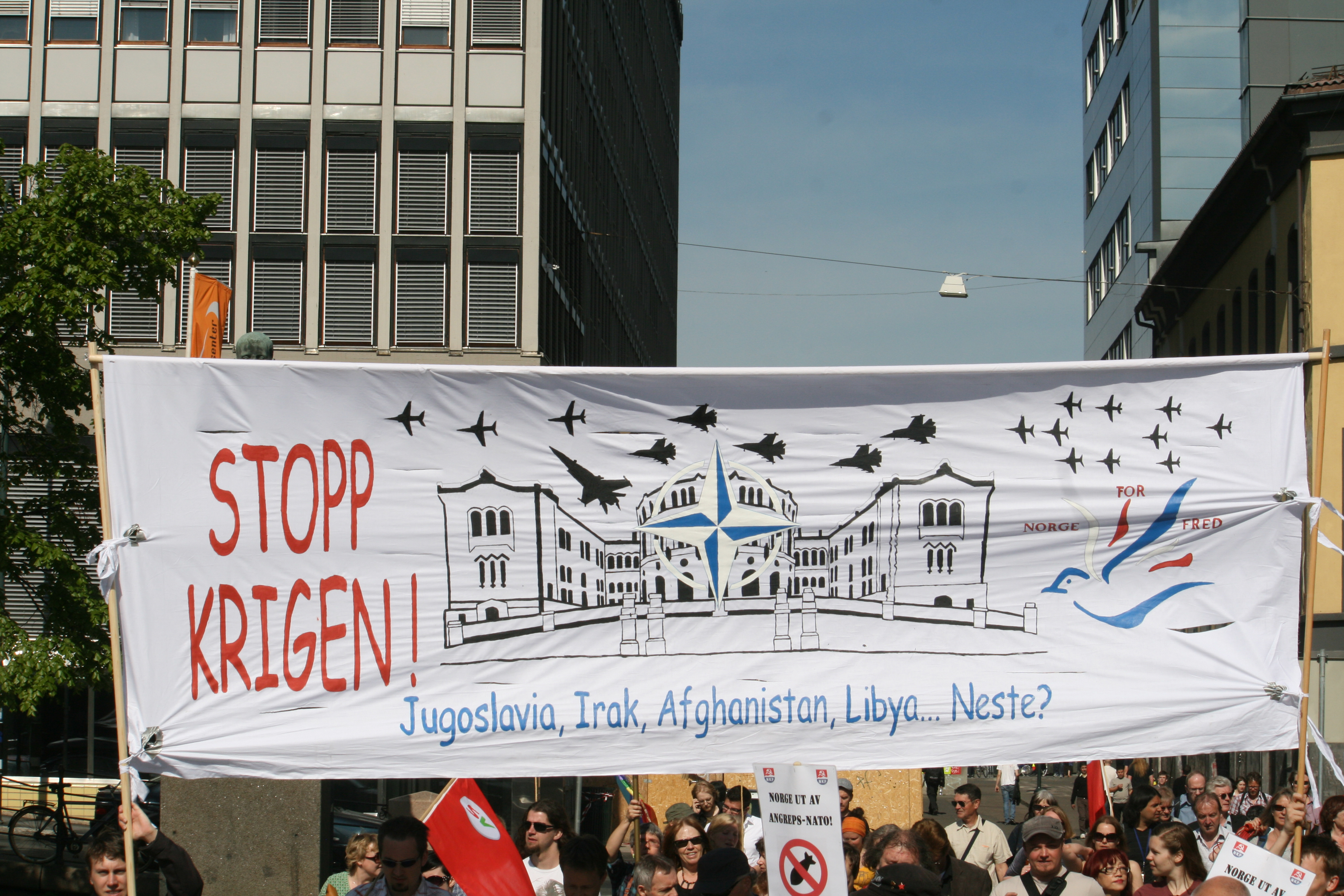
Anti-war protest in Oslo, Norway, May 8, 2011

Among those attending the protest was actor Mike Farrell from M*A*S*H who said he believed the war has wasted billions of dollars without significantly affecting terrorism. Farrell also stated his disappointment that President Barack Obama, who was given a Nobel Peace Prize, had continued the war in Afghanistan.

In New York City, a protest against the war took place in Times Square. Led by the Granny Peace Brigade, they called for the war in Afghanistan to be ended immediately and troops to be brought home.

In New Jersey, around 70 people led by Princeton-based Coalition of Peace Action demonstrated in Trenton to protest the war in Afghanistan on its 10th anniversary – the longest war waged by the United States in its history. Rev. Robert Moore called for American troops to be brought home now, rather than in 2014, in order to save Afghan civilian lives, the lives of American soldiers, and billions of dollars needed at home:

[The war in Afghanistan] is taking money away from job creation and other urgent needs at home. For every soldier brought home from Afghanistan, $1 million is saved, which could create 20 jobs at $50,000 each in the United States.

We need to speak out now, with an estimated 25 million unemployed and foreclosures again on the rise. It's time for our elected officials to bring the war dollars home.

— Rev. Robert Moore, Coalition of Peace Action

Jean Athey, head of an activist group in Maryland, who recently visited Afghanistan, spoke of the impact of the war imposed on Afghans:

There's tremendous suffering there. The Afghanistan people feel the world is fighting a proxy battle in its villages.

On October 8, 2011, anti-war protesters at the Smithsonian Institution's National Air and Space Museum in Washington, D.C. were pepper-sprayed by security forces and the museum was closed early. The protesters, estimated at 100 to 200 people, had planned to participate in a "die-in" at the museum's "Military Unmanned Aerial Vehicles" exhibit to protest the massive military spending and the U.S. use of unmanned military drones against civilians in the war in Afghanistan. Under the Obama administration, drone strikes quadrupled from less than 50 under the Bush administration to more than 220 in the past three years. Dozens of protesters were sickened by the pepper spray, and several people fell to the ground in agony.

In Chicago, a crowd of around 700 people gathered downtown to protest the decade-long war in Afghanistan. The rally began at noon at Congress Parkway and Michigan Avenue, before the anti-war protest marched through downtown Chicago to call for an end to U.S. military action in Afghanistan. Stopping at President Obama's campaign headquarters for the 2012 presidential election, protesters likened Obama to many of his Republican predecessors in his policies on the war and economy.

On October 8, 2011, up to 5,000 people participated in a mass assembly in Trafalgar Square, London to protest 10 years of war in Afghanistan. Speakers addressing the crowds included musician Brian Eno, 106-year-old anti-war campaigner Hetty Bower, journalist John Pilger, WikiLeaks founder Julian Assange, writer and socialite Jemima Khan, and a number of members of the UK Parliament.

A poll published the day before, on the 10th anniversary of the start of the U.S. bombing campaign in 2001, showed that 57% of Britons wanted Western troops withdrawn from Afghanistan immediately.

Lauren Booth, sister-in-law of former prime minister Tony Blair, read out the names of British soldiers killed in the decade-long war. Following the rally, the protesters marched along Whitehall to Downing Street where a delegation called on the British prime minister for the immediate withdrawal of British troops from Afghanistan, delivering a letter from British military families asking him to bring the troops home and spare other families the tragedies they have suffered. The death toll for British soldiers in the war stood at 382.

== 2012 ==
On February 24, 2012, 12 people died in protests against Quran desecration at a NATO military base. NATO said the Qurans were burned by mistake.

== 2021 ==
The Afghanistan war ended.

== See also ==
- Opposition to the War in Afghanistan (2001–2021)
- International public opinion on the war in Afghanistan
- Civilian casualties in the war in Afghanistan (2001–2021)
- Coalition casualties in Afghanistan
- British Forces casualties in Afghanistan since 2001
- Canadian Forces casualties in Afghanistan
- German Armed Forces casualties in Afghanistan
- Bagram torture and prisoner abuse
- Canadian Afghan detainee issue
- List of peace activists
- List of anti-war organizations
- Criticism of the war on terror
- Bertie Lewis
