= LRW =

LRW may refer to:

- Liskov-Rivest-Wagner, in cryptography
- Lifetime Real Women, US television channel
- Little Rock West High School, school in Arkansas
- Waco LRW, a military glider airplane
- Lenthall Road Workshop (LRW) in Hackney, London
