= Alex Nunns =

Alex Nunns is a British author, editor and political activist.

== Life and career ==
Nunns is political correspondent for Red Pepper; contributing articles on British politics and international developments. He has written for other outlets including Le Monde Diplomatique and Novara Media.

With Nadia Idle, Nunns co-edited Tweets from Tahrir: Egypt's revolution as it unfolded, in the words of the people who made it (ISBN 978-1-935928-45-4). Published in April 2011, shortly after the initial uprising of the Egyptian Revolution that overthrew Hosni Mubarak, Tweets from Tahrir was the first book to use content from Twitter as the basis for a historical narrative. The book received wide praise, including from Robert Fisk of The Independent and Scott Malcomson of The New York Times. It was shortlisted for the Bread and Roses Award for Radical Publishing in May 2012. In February 2012, the book inspired a TV documentary by Al Jazeera English.

Nunns' book on Jeremy Corbyn’s rise to the leadership of the Labour Party, The Candidate: Jeremy Corbyn’s Improbable Path to Power, was first published in 2016. It won the 2017 Bread and Roses Award. Robert Potts in The Times Literary Supplement praised the book as a "very well-researched narrative" that was "widely sourced", commenting that “The story of how such an other-worldly figure became leader of the party simply by being himself is an oddly electrifying one”. Stephen Bush of the New Statesman wrote that "Corbyn is at last given a wholly sympathetic hearing", the work being "the most authoritative yet published on his rise", but criticised it for a "lack of fluency around the animating issues of the Labour right". Gaby Hinsliff, in The Guardian, included The Candidate in an article about the best books on politics of 2016.
