= Reni Eddo-Lodge =

British journalist and author (born 1989)

Reni Eddo-Lodge FRSL
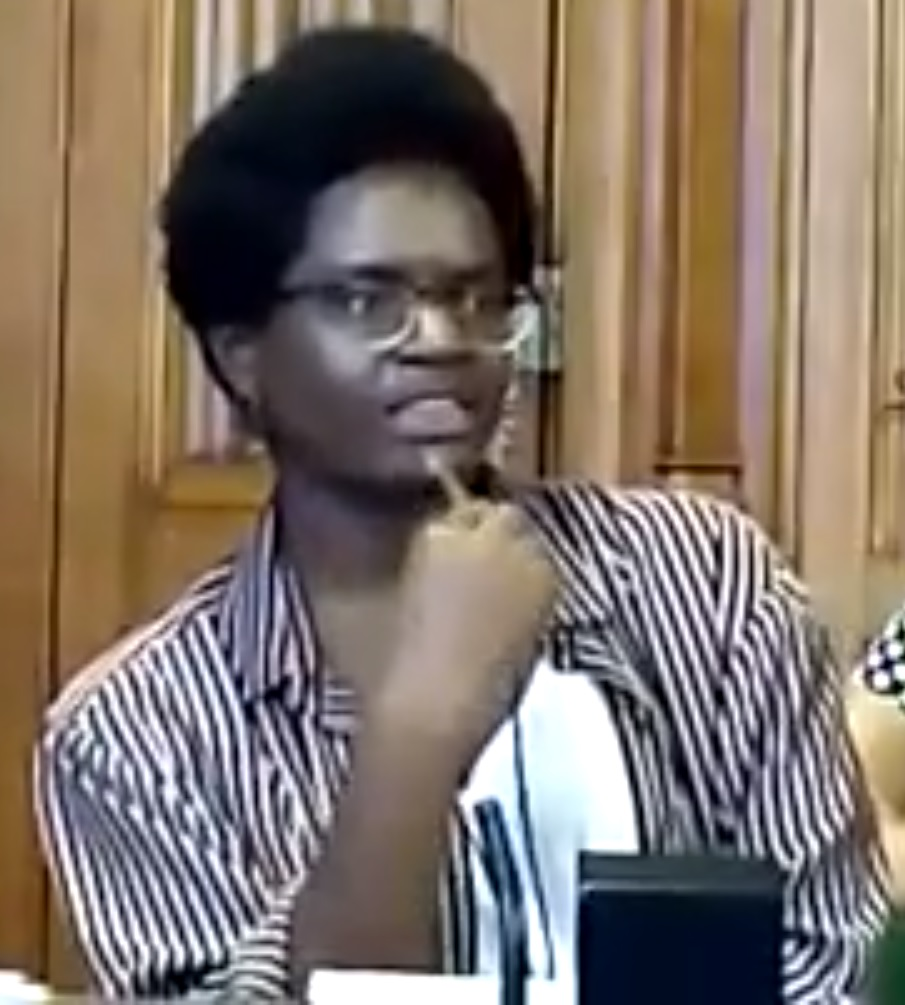
- Eddo-Lodge in 2014
- Born: 25 September 1989 (age 37); London, England
- Education: University of Central Lancashire
- Occupations: Columnist; author
- Writing career
- Subjects: Feminism; Structural racism
- Notable work: Why I'm No Longer Talking to White People About Race (2017)
- Notable awards: Jhalak Prize; Bread and Roses Award for Radical Publishing
- Website: renieddolodge.co.uk

Reni Eddo-Lodge FRSL (born 25 September 1989) is a British journalist and author, whose writing primarily focuses on feminism and exposing structural racism. She has written for a range of publications, including The New York Times, The Guardian, The Independent, The Daily Telegraph, The Voice, BuzzFeed, Vice, i-D and Dazed & Confused, and is a contributor to the 2019 anthology New Daughters of Africa, edited by Margaret Busby.

In June 2020, following the George Floyd protests, her book Why I'm No Longer Talking to White People About Race (published in 2017) rose 155 places to top the UK non-fiction paperback chart, at the same time as Bernardine Evaristo's 2019 novel Girl, Woman, Other topped the paperback fiction chart, the first time books by black British women headed both charts. On 16 June 2020, she became the first black British woman to be No. 1 overall in the British book charts.

== Early life and education ==
Reni Eddo-Lodge was born to a Nigerian mother in London, England, where she was raised. Reni attended St Anne's Catholic High School in Enfield.

She studied English literature at University of Central Lancashire, graduating in 2011. While at university, she became involved in feminist activism and the 2010 student protest movement. She was president of the University of Central Lancashire students' union until 2012, and was an elected member of the National Executive Council of the National Union of Students from 2012 to 2013.

== Career ==
As a freelance journalist, Eddo-Lodge has written for a number of publications, including The New York Times, The Guardian, The Independent, The Daily Telegraph, The Voice, BuzzFeed, Vice, i-D and Dazed & Confused.

In December 2013, Eddo-Lodge appeared on BBC Radio 4's Woman's Hour to discuss the year in feminism alongside activist Caroline Criado Perez. During a discussion on intersectionality, Criado Perez seemed to imply that Eddo-Lodge was involved in online abuse of other feminists. Although Criado Perez apologized for the way her comments could have been interpreted, former Conservative MP Louise Mensch accused Eddo-Lodge of "bullying".

Eddo-Lodge has also appeared on BBC Radio 3's Night Waves, discussing feminist issues. In April 2014, she was a judge in the BBC Woman's Hour Power List 2014.

Eddo-Lodge's first book, Why I'm No Longer Talking to White People About Race, was published in 2017, going on to win multiple awards in the years following its publication, and by the time she was 30 had sold more than a million books, making her the first black writer to top the British book charts.

Eddo-Lodge teamed up with podcast producer Renay Richardson to create About Race with Reni Eddo-Lodge, which premiered in March 2018, and was named one of the best podcasts of 2018 by British GQ and Wired. The podcast was chosen as one of the best podcasts of the year by Apple Podcasts, Spotify, Harper's Bazaar UK, The Guardian, British GQ, and Wired UK. Seen as a complement to the book, the podcast examined Britain's modern relationship with race.

In January 2018, Eddo-Lodge was chosen as one of seven prominent British women to be photographed for British Vogue, to mark the centenary of British women winning the right to vote. In the 2020 and 2021 editions of the Powerlist, Eddo-Lodge was listed in the Top 100 of the most influential people in the UK of African/African-Caribbean descent.

Her essay "Women, Down your Tools" was included in the 2019 anthology New Daughters of Africa edited by Margaret Busby.

In July 2020, Lodge partnered with Emma Watson and the WOW Foundation to spearhead a project reimagining the London Underground Map, renaming the 270 stops to spotlight women and non-binary people who have shaped the city's history. The "City of Women London" initiative consulted writers, museums, and librarians and was published by Haymarket Books on International Women's Day 2022.

In December 2024, it was announced that Eddo-Lodge would be launching the imprint Monument Books, in collaboration with HarperCollins (4th Estate), in order to "pay it forward" through publishing authors who champion "ideas, stories and culture, as well as uplifting or refashioning past legacies".

=== Why I'm No Longer Talking to White People About Race (2017) ===
Eddo-Lodge's debut book, the polemic Why I'm No Longer Talking to White People About Race, was released by Bloomsbury Publishing, made available in bookshops and online, in June 2017. Initial reviews were positive, with 2015 Booker Prize-winner Marlon James writing that it was "essential" and "begging to be written". Others, such as Trevor Phillips in The Sunday Times took issue with the book, Phillips claiming that it probed "delicate knotted issues with all the subtlety of a blunderbuss". The book won the Jhalak Prize and the British Book Award for narrative non-fiction in March 2018.

==== Impact during the Black Lives Matter protests ====
In June 2020, Eddo-Lodge's book Why I'm No Longer Talking to White People About Race rose 155 places in the official Bookseller chart. The upsurge in sales took place in the wake of the murder of George Floyd and subsequent global Black Lives Matter protests. This meant that she became the first black British woman to top the non-fiction book-selling charts at number 1; the fiction chart was simultaneously topped by the novelist Bernardine Evaristo. Eddo-Lodge stated that she was "dismayed by ... the tragic circumstances in which this achievement came about". On 16 June 2020, Eddo-Lodge became the first black British woman to be No. 1 overall in the British book charts.

== Awards and recognition ==
| Year | Award or recognition |
|---|---|
| 2010 | Highly commended, Channel 4 News Young Blogger of the Year |
| 2014 | The Guardian Top 30 Young People in Digital Media |
| 2014 | The Root 30 Viral Voices Under 30 |
| 2014 | Elle Inspire 100 |
| 2015 | MHP 30 to Watch Award |
| 2017 | Longlisted – the Baillie Gifford Prize for Non-Fiction for Why I'm No Longer Talking to White People About Race |
| 2018 | Longlisted – the Orwell Prize for Political Writing for Why I'm No Longer Talking to White People About Race |
| 2018 | Jhalak Prize for Book of the Year by a Writer of Colour, for Why II'm No Longer Talking to White Peoople About Race |
| 2018 | Why I'm No Longer Talking to White People About Race topped a public poll of 20 books shortlisted by the UK Booksellers Association for the most influential book written by a woman |
| 2018 | Bread and Roses Award for Radical Publishing for Why I'm No Longer Talking to White People About Race (joint winner) |
| 2018 | British Book Awards – Non-fiction: Narrative Book of the Year for Why I'm No Longer Talking to White People About Race |
| 2021 | Elected a Fellow of the Royal Society of Literature (FRSL) |
| 2025 | The University of York honorary degree of Doctor |

== Criticism ==
In an interview published by The Spectator in October 2020 entitled "Kemi Badenoch: The problem with critical race theory", Badenoch, the Equalities Minister, accused authors such as Eddo-Lodge and Robin DiAngelo, whose book sales surged in the aftermath of the murder of George Floyd, of using critical race theory to segregate society.

More than 100 leading black writers, including Bernardine Evaristo, Malorie Blackman and Benjamin Zephaniah have condemned the comments of Badenoch, not just for the content of her remarks, but also accusing Badenoch of endangering the personal safety of anti-racist writers by singling them out. Eddo-Lodge demanded a correction and apology from The Spectator, who refused but offered her a column to reply; her complaint is currently lodged with IPSO. The Independent also ran the same story and have since printed a correction at the request of Eddo-Lodge. Neither had been in touch with Eddo-Lodge before printing the articles.
