= Friends World Committee for Consultation =

Quaker non-governmental organisation

- Abbreviation: FWCC
- Established: 1937; 89 years ago
- Founded at: Swarthmore, Pennsylvania
- Type: NGO
- Legal status: Charity
- Purpose: Encouraging fellowship and understanding among all the branches of the Religious Society of Friends
- Headquarters: London, United Kingdom
- Official languages: English, Spanish, French, Kiswahili
- General Secretary: Tim Gee
- Clerk: Esther Mombo
- Publication: Friends World News
- Website: fwcc.world

The Friends World Committee for Consultation (FWCC) is a Quaker organisation that works to communicate between all parts of Quakerism. FWCC's world headquarters is in London. It has held General Consultative NGO status with the Economic and Social Council of the United Nations since 2002. FWCC shares responsibility for the Quaker UN Office in Geneva and New York City with the American Friends Service Committee and Britain Yearly Meeting.

World War I peace work brought the diverse Friends together leading to a sense of world followship while respecting the autonomy of the individual yearly meetings and other Quaker organisations. FWCC was set up at the 1937 Second World Conference of Friends in Swarthmore, Pennsylvania, US,

to act in a consultative capacity to promote better understanding among Friends the world over, particularly by the encouragement of joint conferences and intervisitation, the collection and circulation of information about Quaker literature and other activities directed towards that end.

Between representative meetings, governance is carried out by a Central Executive Committee of 17 members from around the world, which meets annually in a different part of the world. The current General Secretary is Tim Gee.

== Structure ==
FWCC has four sections in addition to the world office in London:

- Africa Section, based in Nairobi, Kenya
- Asia and West Pacific Section, based in Australia
- Europe and Middle East Section, based in Birmingham, England
- Section of the Americas, based in Philadelphia, Pennsylvania, United States

=== Africa Section ===
Africa Section represents Friends throughout the continent of Africa. Most African Friends are from the evangelical and programmed traditions. However, a significant minority are from the unprogrammed tradition. South Africa Yearly Meeting is principally an unprogrammed Yearly Meeting and there are unprogrammed Meetings elsewhere in Africa, notably in Kenya. Africa Section is numerically the most numerous of the Sections and the administrative headquarters are in Nairobi, Kenya. The 2012 Friends World Conference was held in Kenya.

=== Asia West Pacific Section ===
Asia West Pacific Section (AWPS) is geographically the largest FWCC Section, stretching from Japan in the north to New Zealand and Australia in the south and from the Philippines in the east to India in the west. Asia West Pacific Section is growing significantly and recently welcomed into Membership the Philippine Evangelical Friends Church, a Filipino programmed and evangelical Friends Meeting; Marble Rock Friends and Mahoba Yearly Meeting in India. Some AWPS Friends Meetings are numerically small, e.g. those in Korea and Hong Kong but nonetheless give generously to Friends work internationally and contribute a lot to the life of Friends. Other Friends Meetings in the Section are relatively large with several thousand Friends. The geographical area of the AWPS region includes numerically large Friends Meetings of the evangelical programmed tradition which have not as yet affiliated with FWCC, although friendly relations are maintained locally.

=== Europe and Middle East Section ===
Europe and Middle East Section (EMES) is numerically the smallest of the Quaker Sections but historically the oldest and is growing in former Eastern Bloc countries, though declining in so-called Western Europe countries. EMES includes Britain Yearly Meeting, the mother Meeting of Friends, being the heir to the former London Yearly Meeting. Britain Yearly Meeting's "Faith and Practice" or book of discipline is used by many Friends around the world as a guide to Friends' practices and procedures. Britain Yearly Meeting is the largest Meeting in the Section with approximately 16,000 Members, followed by Ireland Yearly Meeting with around 1,000 Members. Other Yearly Meetings in Europe are small, in some cases smaller than Monthly Meetings in Asia but retain the name and form of Yearly Meetings for historical reasons.

Friends have a long-standing presence in the Middle East and Palestine, dating back to Ottoman times. For example, Ramallah Friends School is a noted educational center and Friends are active in attempts to build peace at the grass roots in this troubled area. Britain Yearly Meeting's Quaker Peace and Social Witness (QPSW) is one of the significant international Friends agencies. The FWCC Quaker United Nations Office (QUNO) in Geneva is partly supported by Britain Yearly Meeting. Friends presence at the United Nations has engaged and continues to engage in quiet diplomacy to reduce violence and build peace around the world. Friends House in Geneva hosts Geneva Meeting.

=== Section of the Americas ===
Section of the Americas is numerically the second largest section and includes Friends from all Friends traditions in both North and South America as well as in the Caribbean and Central America. Section of the Americas is officially bi-lingual in Spanish and English, though Canada Yearly Meeting also operates in both English and French. FWCC's other QUNO branch is located adjacent to the New York UN Building and is closely connected with the quasi-Quaker organisation American Friends Service Committee (AFSC). AFSC was founded by Friends and still has a substantially Friends Board of Trustees, however, only the director of AFSC is required to be a Friend and the vast majority of AFSC staff, including senior staff, are not Friends and are not familiar with Friends worship or testimonies leading to some Friends' Meetings distancing themselves from AFSC and its activities. In 1947 the Nobel Peace Prize was awarded to Friends for 300 years of work for peace and received on behalf of Friends by AFSC and its London counterpart, the Friends Service Committee, now known as Quaker Peace and Social Witness.

Approximately 131,000 Friends live in the Americas. US Friends are often relatively affluent whereas many Latin American Friends come from relatively impoverished and oppressed indigenous communities. As in Asia and Africa, in Latin America, Friends are a growing church. Section of the Americas Friends have a long history dating back to the mid-17th Century. Friends founded or helped found a number of the US States, notably Pennsylvania, named after distinguished 17th Century English Friend, William Penn; Rhode Island; New Jersey and Delaware all had substantial Friends' contributions in their founding. William Penn's constitutional documents for Pennsylvania formed an important and influential source for the later United States Constitution. In the early colonial period Friends were persecuted in Massachusetts and New York. Friends also had a substantial impact in the early days of colonisation of the Caribbean, for example in the 17th century and early 18th century 25% of the population of Barbados was Friends. The history of suffering is a uniting factor with Latin American Friends, many of whom live in difficult circumstances and find living the transformative Peace Testimony a daily commitment.

== FWCC World Conferences, Triennials, and World Plenary Meetings ==
World Conference of Friends are larger, less frequent events, often designed for broader participation and specific themes; the first was held in the UK in 1920 and the second, at which FWCC was founded, took place in Pennsylvania in 1937. The World Plenary Meetings (formerly Triennials) are the business meetings of representatives between the World Conference meetings.

	Location	Date	Theme
1st	United Kingdom	1920	
2nd	Pennsylvania, USA	1937	Founding date of FWCC
3rd	Oxford, England	1952	
4th	Greensboro, North Carolina, USA	1967	
5th	Netherlands, Honduras and Kenya	1991	
6th	Nakuru, Kenya	17–25 April 2012	"Being salt and Light: Friends living the Kingdom of God in a broken world".
7th	To be planned	2037	FWCC centenary

Between the World Conferences, Triennial meetings of representatives were held up to 2007, when it was decided that there should be longer gaps between these meetings, in part due to environmental concerns.

	Location	Date	Theme
16th	Mexico	1985	Profundizar Más = Digging deeper.
17th	Tokyo	August 1988	"Finding our Prophetic Voice"
-		1991	5th World Conference
18th	New Mexico, USA	August 1994	On being publishers of truth.
19th	Birmingham, England	July 1997	Answering the love of God: living our testimonies.
20th	New Hampshire, USA	July 2000	"Friends: A People Called to Listen, Gathered to Seek, Sent Forth to Serve"
21st	Aotearoa/New Zealand	January 2004	"Being Faithful Witnesses: Serving God in a Changing World".
22nd Last	Dublin, Ireland	11–19 August 2007	"Finding the Prophetic Voice for our Time".
-		2012	6th World Conference

Beginning in 2016, World Plenary Meetings will be held every 7-8 years; also called the International Representatives Meetings.

	Location	Date	Theme
1st	Pisac, Peru	19–27 January 2016	"Living the Transformation: Creation waits with eager longing for the revealing of the Children of God".
2nd	Vanderbijlpark, South Africa	August 2024	"Living the spirit of Ubuntu: Responding with hope to God’s call to cherish creation – and one another"
3rd	To be planned	2031-32	
-		2037	7th World Conference - FWCC centennial

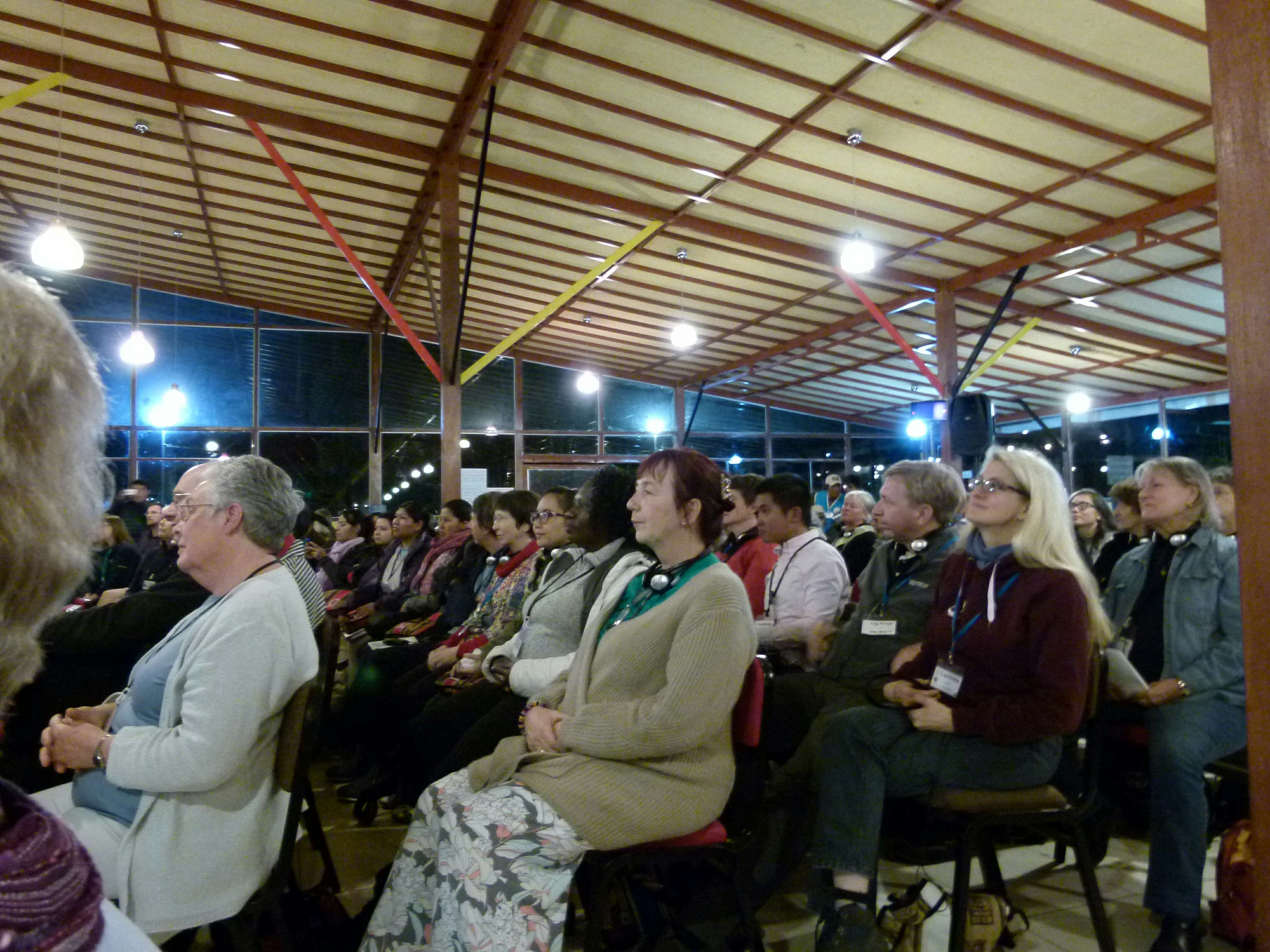
Friends at the 2016 FWCC Plenary Meeting in Pisac, Peru
