= Dan Hicks (archaeologist) =

British archaeologist and anthropologist

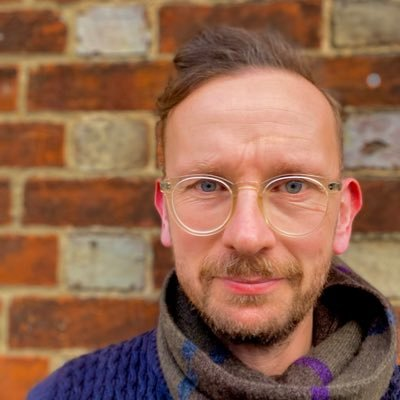
- Born: Spennymoor, County Durham, England
- Education: St John's College, Oxford; University of Bristol
- Occupations: Archaeologist; Anthropologist; Art Historian; Museum Curator
- Website: www.danhicks.uk

Dan Hicks, FSA (born 1972) is a British archaeologist and anthropologist. He is Professor of Contemporary Archaeology at the University of Oxford, Curator at the Pitt Rivers Museum, and a Fellow of St Cross College, Oxford. His research is focused on contemporary archaeology, material culture studies, historical archaeology, colonial history, heritage studies, and the history of art, archaeology, anthropology, and museum collections.

== Early life and education ==
Hicks studied archaeology and anthropology at St John's College, Oxford, gaining a Bachelor of Arts (BA) degree. He received his Doctor of Philosophy (PhD) degree in archaeology and anthropology from the University of Bristol.

== Career ==
Hicks worked as a field archaeologist in the local authority and private sector in the 1990s. He has conducted fieldwork in the UK, the eastern Caribbean, and the eastern United States, and has published on archaeological and ethnographic collections from around the world. He was previously Lecturer in Archaeology and Anthropology at St John's College, Oxford, Lecturer in Archaeology and Anthropology at the University of Bristol, and Research Fellow in Archaeology and Anthropology at Boston University. Hicks is Professor of Contemporary Archaeology at the University of Oxford and Curator at the Pitt Rivers Museum.

Hicks has appeared on BBC Radio 4's In Our Time and Making History. In 2017-18 he was the Junior Proctor of the University of Oxford. Hicks has also served as a non-executive director of Museum of London Archaeology, a member of council and trustee of the Society of Antiquaries of London, a trustee and delegate of Oxford University Press, and a trustee and member of council of the University of Oxford. In 2019, Hicks co-curated the exhibition Lande: The Calais ‘Jungle’ and Beyond at the Pitt Rivers Museum. In 2021-22, Hicks was advisor to Isaac Julien for his work Once Again (Statues Never Die), commissioned by the Barnes Foundation. In 2022, he curated an installation by the Nigerian artist Victor Ehikhamenor at St Paul's Cathedral.

Hicks's 2020 book The Brutish Museums is the subject of both praise and criticism. It was named one of the New York Times Best Arts Books of 2020, and was described as "a startling act of conscience" by Ben Okri, as "masterful" by the LA Review of Books, and by The Guardian as "A beautifully written, carefully argued book". It was also criticised with Nigel Biggar saying "Brutish Museums is an object lesson in how political zeal can abuse data in the cause of manufacturing an expedient narrative" and Richard Morrison of The Times saying "Hicks’s vision of great museums returning hundreds of thousands of items...to the possible descendants (or not) of the peoples who created them, in some cases thousands of years ago, strikes me as being so impractical on so many levels that it could only have come from someone who makes his living in an ivory tower that’s actually stocked with ivory". Staffan Lundén criticized the book, saying it let "emotion, oversimplified messages, and personal opinion take precedence over evidence." Hicks' response was published in the International Journal of Cultural Property, noting that "Lundén’s paper does not identify a single substantive mistake or incorrect fact in The Brutish Museums" and that "this is not first time that Lundén has leveled the charge of “distorting history” against other writers and museum curators with whose accounts of the history of the Benin Expedition he disagrees. Lundén has previously accused John Mack, Nigel Barley, and Neil MacGregor of the British Museum of “exaggeration,” “mythmaking.”

In June 2023 Hicks was announced as Chair of Judges for the 2023 Hessell-Tiltman Prize.

Hicks has written comment and opinion pieces in The Guardian, The Telegraph, Hyperallergic, The Art Newspaper and Art Review, covering issues around museums, art, colonial history, cultural restitution, heritage policy and archaeology.

In 2022 Hicks was caught up in controversy with his contributions to decolonising the Wellcome Collection's "Medicine Man" exhibit. He was criticised for "cloudy vagueness" and historical inaccuracy in asserting that Jeremy Bentham was opposed to the abolition of slavery and involved in the invention of race science. He responded to this accusation by claiming that the provision of bodies for anatomical investigation was a key part of the development of 19th century race science.

He delivered the 2020 Schöne Lecture of the Technische University, Berlin; the 2021 Marilyn Strathern Lecture at the University of Cambridge; the 2021 Spence Lecture at Western University, Ontario; the 2022 Robert K. Webb Lecture at UMBC Baltimore; the 2021 Goethe Lecture of the Goethe Institute in London; the 2022 Bernie Grant Memorial Lecture at the Bernie Grant Arts Centre; and the 2023 Driedger Lecture at University of Lethbridge.

== Honours ==
On 24 January 2008, Hicks was elected a Fellow of the Society of Antiquaries of London (FSA). He is also a full Member of the Chartered Institute for Archaeologists (MCIfA). In 2017-18 Hicks was visiting professor at the Musée du quai Branly – Jacques Chirac. In 2017, Hicks was awarded the Rivers Memorial Medal by the Royal Anthropological Institute. Hicks' book The Brutish Museums was the joint winner of the 2021 Elliott P Skinner Book Prize of the Association for Africanist Anthropology, and won the 2022 Best Book in Public History of the National Council on Public History. It was also shortlisted for the 2021 Bread and Roses Award.

== Books ==
- Hicks, Dan (2025). Every Monument Will Fall: A Story of Remembering and Forgetting. Hutchinson Heinemann. ISBN 978-1-5291-5274-6.
- Hicks, Dan (2020). The Brutish Museums: the Benin Bronzes, colonial violence and cultural restitution. Pluto Press. ISBN 978-0-7453 4176-7.
- Hicks, Dan; Mallet, Sarah (2019). Lande: the Calais "Jungle" and Beyond. Bristol University Press. ISBN 978-1-5292-0618-0.
- Hicks, Dan (2019). Archaeology and Photography: time, objectivity and archive. Bloomsbury. ISBN 978-1-3500-2968-2. (edited with Lesley McFadyen).
- Boyd, Alex; Meades, Jonathan; Hicks, Dan (2019). Isle of Rust. Luath Press. ISBN 978-1-9130-2500-7.
- Hicks, Dan (2013). World Archaeology at the Pitt Rivers Museum: a characterization. Archaeopress. ISBN 978-1-90-573958-5. (edited with Alice Stevenson).
- Hicks, Dan (2010). The Oxford Handbook of Material Culture Studies. Oxford University Press. ISBN 978-0-19-921871-4. (edited with Mary C. Beaudry).
- Hicks, Dan (2007). The Garden of the World: An Historical Archaeology of Sugar Landscapes in the Eastern Caribbean. Archaeopress (Studies in Contemporary and Historical Archaeology 3, British Archaeological Reports International Series 163). ISBN 978-1-4073-0046-7.
- Hicks, Dan (2007). Envisioning Landscape: Situations and Standpoints in Archaeology and Heritage. Walnut Creek: Left Coast Press (One World Archaeology 52). ISBN 978-1-59874-281-7. (edited with Laura McAtackney and Graham Fairclough).
- Hicks, Dan (2006). The Cambridge Companion to Historical Archaeology. Cambridge University Press. ISBN 978-0-521-85375-0. (edited with Mary C. Beaudry).
