= Crippled =

2019 book by Frances Ryan

- Front cover
- Author: Frances Ryan
- Subject: Disability and austerity in the UK
- Publisher: Verso Books
- Publication date: June 2019
- Pages: 240
- ISBN: 9781788739566

Crippled: Austerity and the Demonization of Disabled People is a 2019 book by Frances Ryan about disability in the United Kingdom under the 2010s austerity programme. It explores the effects of welfare cuts, local council cuts, social care cuts, increased taxes for disabled people and means testing for remaining welfare provisions. Between research about the prevalence of each issue, Ryan interviews disabled people affected by the issue. She finds people who have died from having financial support withdrawn, people who cannot afford food, heating or prescriptions, and people unable to wash or get dressed due to removal of social care. Ryan researches into disabled people who live in inaccessible housing, who cannot afford visits to the hospital, who cannot leave violent partners for financial reasons and who rely on young children to look after them.

Ryan is a journalist for The Guardian and a wheelchair user herself. In Crippled—her first book, published by Verso—she aimed to let disabled people report their own situations, cover past successes of disability rights activism, and show that hardship faced by disabled people in the UK is the result of political decisions. The book received a nomination for a Bread and Roses Award. It was received positively by critics, who praised its message, the importance of its subject matter, and Ryan's research.

The fictional short film Hen Night, released by BBC iPlayer on 2 September 2021, was inspired by the book and created by Ryan and Vici Wreford-Sinnott. It features a young disabled trainee teacher during the COVID-19 pandemic as the government withdraws her support.

== Background ==
Frances Ryan is a journalist with a PhD in politics; she writes the weekly column Hardworking Britain for The Guardian. She began writing about disability in 2012. She uses a wheelchair. In Crippled, her first book, Ryan sought to combine anecdotes to show the "human cost of a policy" with research to show that the experience is a common one, to refute government ministers who dismissed personal stories as non-representative. Ryan was also keen to let disabled people speak for themselves, in contrast to the usual presentation of disability in the media. For research on disabled people who were killed by removal of their benefits, Ryan collected names and photographs from local papers, as they were not reported on more widely. Additionally, Ryan saw it important to cover past successes of the disability rights movement, to show "hope and autonomy". She also wanted to demonstrate that difficulties faced by disabled people were the results of political choices, and not inevitable.

The book was published by Verso in June 2019. Due to a chronic illness, Ryan was unable to travel for a book tour, so she spoke at online events. For a television interview about her book, she declined a producer's suggestion that she be filmed performing tasks around her house, as she did not think this would have been asked were she not disabled.

== Synopsis ==
In 2010, the UK Cameron–Clegg coalition government began an austerity programme that reduced public spending. In the introduction, Ryan comments on its disproportionate effect on disabled people, and the tabloid media's focus on "benefits scroungers" that demonised them. Though Theresa May claimed in 2018 that "austerity is over", her government continued implementing cuts. Ryan gives an example of Jimbob, who is confined to his bedroom for almost all of the day as he can only afford to heat one room of his house.

The first chapter—"Poverty"—describes Susan's life in austerity. By 2013, new bedroom tax, council tax and social care bills saw her enter debt for energy bills, so she stopped using heating or her oven. By 2017, she could not afford to leave the house or buy the puréed specialist meals she required with her digestive condition. She was continuing to pay back a payday loan to replace a freezer for medication. In 2018, 4 million adults in the UK lived in poverty and in 2017, a fifth of disabled adults regularly skipped meals or limited their diet—these figures increased in the 2010s. While money from disability benefits was reduced, Bessie had her benefits removed through means testing, despite being unable to work due to agoraphobia. Around half of disabled people subject to means testing had benefits stopped or removed. A combination of welfare cuts by 2018 saw disabled people losing an average of £4,400 per year, with 200,000 people losing at least £15,000 per year. However, the welfare state has not always been in decline since its inception from the 1940s to the 1960s: for instance, disabled activists secured the Disability Discrimination Act 1992 and the establishment of the Disability Living Allowance.

In "Work", Ryan describes two similar cases of diabetic people who died from the removal of Jobseeker's Allowance after they missed in-person appointments. The Department for Work and Pensions (DWP) issued one million sanctions to disabled people between 2010 and 2017, who were 50% more likely than non-disabled unemployed counterparts to experience sanctions, including for failing to attend "work-related activity" such as skills training courses, or missing meetings due to hospital appointments or being hospitalised. The Cameron–Clegg coalition forced Incapacity Benefit recipients to go through outsourced private means testing processes that did not consult subjects' GPs or allow for specialist assessment, and cost more money than was saved by denial of benefits. Though the New Labour government increased the percentage of disabled people in work from 38% to 47%, the increase slowed under austerity and the Work Programme led to only 7% of disabled participants securing long-term jobs. In the workplace, half of disabled people experience bullying or harassment, and 70% experience discrimination; legal aid for employment tribunals was cut in 2013.

In the next chapter, "Independence", Ryan argues that recipients of social care are assumed to be elderly, while disabled people—a third of social care recipients—are overlooked. In 2010, Rachel was no longer visited by a care worker to prepare for bed; in 2011, her dinnertime assistance was removed, leaving her unable to make a hot meal; and in 2017, her morning care slot to help her wash and dress was taken away. She became malnourished. In 2016, it was estimated that one million disabled people had insufficient social care; a quarter of disabled people saw care cut in the following two years. This left people unable to dress, wash or eat meals each day, or forced them to wait 12 hours to use the toilet. While local government funding was cut, the government encouraged charities to fill roles in supporting disabled people. Around 3,000 working-age adults have been consigned to care homes for the elderly, where abuse has been documented. Decreasing support for the Motability scheme and wheelchair provision denied disabled people from the autonomy to leave their house for medical appointments, shopping or social events.

"Housing" documents how Robert, a paralysed 38-year-old, was assigned a second-floor flat by his council, with no lift access; leaving the flat for medical appointments takes two hours, as a personal assistant drags him down the stairs in a way that has caused him many injuries. The flat is not large enough for him to use his wheelchair, so he is physically dragged around it by an assistant. Around a sixth of disabled adults and half of disabled children live in inaccessible housing; Mind found in 2018 that 80% of people with mental health problems report it being caused or exacerbating by housing issues. As fewer adults own their own home, and council houses sold under Right to Buy have not been replaced, more disabled people enter the rental market, where landlords may decline prospective tenants on benefits or refuse accessibility adaptations. Fuchsia is one of 300,000 British people living in temporary accommodation; placed in a hotel by a council, her bedding is medically insufficient and there is no kitchen or wheelchair accessibility. The bedroom tax left many disabled people homeless.

In "Women", Ryan interviews Alice—a 24-year-old woman who had to leave a university administration job due to her bipolar II disorder. As she was denied benefits, she relies on sex work, which allows her flexible hours. However, she is deep in debt. Benefits sanctions saw many disabled women enter or re-enter sex work. In 2017–18, a third of women receiving long-term support from Refuge were disabled. Bethany, a deaf woman, experienced verbal and physical abuse from her husband, with whom she had two children. An early attempt to leave her husband failed as a refuge centre had no sign language interpreters; many refuges deny interpreters due to "no visitor" policies, or refuse deaf people for fire safety concerns. Around a fifth of specialist refuges closed from 2010 to 2017. According to the Home Affairs Select Committee in 2018, the Universal Credit system made it more difficult for victims of abuse to leave their partners. In other family lives, charities estimate 700,000 young people care for a disabled parent, with 250,000 providing a "high level of care".

The final chapter—"Children"—covers the impact of child benefit and child tax credit cuts on disabled children. In 2017, 80% of families including a disabled child could not afford needs including new clothing, transport to hospital appointments, food, heating or birthday presents. Public playgrounds, youth centres, libraries, parks and Sure Start centres have all been affected by austerity. Satnam is a single mother, as her partner was jailed for domestic violence; one of her three children is disabled. She relied on respite care to take day trips with her other two children, rest, or have emergency surgery, but this was removed in 2018. In 2015, 80% of family carers reported anxiety and 50% reported depression due to their responsibilities. News media covered the suicide of Jane Kavangh, a mother who was given no respite care, social care or housing adaptations for her 15-year-old daughter, in 2018. Austerity caused the number of disabled children segregated into specialist schools to rise, while 10% of specialist deaf teachers were cut. Half of students excluded from school have special educational needs and disabilities.

To conclude, Ryan calls for a "solidarity politics" that recognises the value of disabled people to society and calls for the strengthening of the welfare state. An afterword in the second edition comments that the 2019 United Kingdom general election saw the success of a Conservative party signalling further defunding of the welfare state, while the COVID-19 pandemic disproportionately killed disabled people and led many to remain housebound ("shield") for months. However, the government's support packages showed that large-scale investment is possible, and local mutual aid groups supported people who were forced into isolation.

== Reception ==
The book was one of the six nominees for the 2020 Bread and Roses Award by the Alliance of Radical Booksellers, which celebrates political non-fiction.

Ryan was appointed as a Fellow of the Royal Society of Literature in 2022, due in combination to her authorship of Crippled and her writing for The Guardian.

=== Critical reception ===
In The Observer, Yvonne Roberts reviewed Crippled as "an admirably comprehensive charge sheet of the scale of state abuse", praising Ryan's argument that the demonisation of disabled people was designed to distract from the human rights violations they faced. Alex Clark of Financial Times compared it favourably to Darren McGarvey's Poverty Safari, finding it "sobering, but fundamentally necessary" information. Clark was most surprised by how the impact of austerity on disabled people "is so frequently hidden" from those unaffected by it and praised Ryan for her "wide-ranging research".

Reviewing for The Guardian, Alice O'Keeffe called the book a "blistering polemic" with "a devastating case to make", but suggested that organising the book as a collection of case studies may have "dialled down the polemic and encouraged more empathy". Contrastingly, Learning Disability Wales' policy officer Grace Krause reviewed that Ryan's interleaving of research and personal stories is "devastatingly efficient in giving disabled people themselves a voice ... while making readers aware of the extent of suffering that has been caused by austerity policies". Krause praised Ryan's "passionate defence of every person's right to live a dignified life" and "rejection of the idea that disabled people should be protected because they are somehow inherently vulnerable".

Journal of Social Policy's Rebecca Porter similarly praised that Ryan's mixture of case studies and statistics "put a human face on the crisis". Believing the book was "very timely and desperately needed", Porter saw its role as similar to The Disabled State by Deborah Stone, a 1984 book that explored government rhetoric around disability and the welfare state. Porter criticised, however, that the book gives little attention to welfare restrictions like the Work Capability Assessment under Gordon Brown's Labour government.

Mike Ervin of The Progressive chose the book as his favourite of 2019, finding that its presentation of British conservatism parallels American conservative policy on disability. The Independent recommended the book in 2021 as one of the "8 best books to read that inspire change this International Women's Day". Joanna Whitehead praised its "rigorous reporting", its "shattering case studies" and its "history of the hard-won rights secured by disabled people".

== Hen Night ==
Based on Crippled, Ryan and Vici Wreford-Sinnott created a 20-minute short film, Hen Night, for BBC iPlayer. It was released on 2 September 2021. A fictional disabled trainee teacher in her 20s, Jessica, recounts her hasty hen night, scheduled to just precede the first COVID-19 lockdown in the UK. She describes the difficulties she faces as her government support is withdrawn. Kate Lovell of Disability Arts Online lauded the piece as "fiercely urgent". Lovell praised the "cool and steely naturalism" of Chegwin and the film's attention to detail—such as the implication of no steam rising from a "hot" drink Jessica pours.

The short film arose after Wreford-Sinnott—the creator of a play about disability and austerity—contacted Ryan after reading Crippled. They wanted to feature a young disabled person who enjoys their life and needs social care to maintain their independence, in order to challenge narratives that disabled people lead unhappy lives and that social care is for older people. Jessica is played by Nicola Chegwin, a disabled actor. The film was commissioned as part of the BBC's Culture in Quarantine series. The Guardian reported that it was "the first ever disabled, women-led piece of UK broadcasting".
