= Why I'm No Longer Talking to White People About Race =

2017 debut book by Reni Eddo-Lodge

- Cover
- Author: Reni Eddo-Lodge
- Language: English
- Subjects: Race, racism, feminism
- Published: 1 June 2017
- Publisher: Bloomsbury Publishing
- Publication place: United Kingdom
- Media type: Print
- Awards: Jhalak Prize
- ISBN: 978-1-4088-7056-3 paperback

Why I'm No Longer Talking to White People About Race is a 2017 debut book by British writer Reni Eddo-Lodge that was published by Bloomsbury Publishing.

== Summary ==
The book explores the links between gender, class and race in Britain and other countries.

The book begins with a summary of the experience of Black and Asian people in the UK, including the Atlantic slave trade, Indian soldiers in World War I, the Bristol Bus Boycott, the 1981 riots and Labour Party Black Sections.

The book also covers institutional racism in British society, White feminism, and definitions of class that only include White people.

== Reviews ==
Trevor Phillips reviewed the work for The Times. In The Times Literary Supplement, Bernardine Evaristo described the book's title as "gloriously provocative", noting that it was "marketing gold" in the climate surrounding the Black Lives Matter movement. Evaristo described the work as "timely and accessible", "comprehensive and journalistic" as well as "resolutely unacademic", comparing it to the work of African-American writer Roxane Gay, whose 2014 anthology Bad Feminist "treads some of the same ground". However, she critiques Eddo-Lodge for not engaging in enough "rigorous research, particularly into the past" and for the fact that she "completely overlooks" the work of Black British feminist writers such as Beverley Bryan, Stella Dadzie and Suzanne Scafe. Evaristo also noted that the book leaves open further questions, including: "What is the responsibility of black people in creating change for ourselves? Without also taking responsibility, we are dependent and powerless. What about the numerous positive developments since Windrush?"

Arifa Akbar reviewed the work for the Financial Times, noting that Eddo-Lodge "builds on a critical tradition drawn from black American writers" like W. E. B. Du Bois, James Baldwin, and bell hooks. Akbar notes that "Not everyone will find the answer to racial inequality in Eddo-Lodge's reliance on White consciousness-raising, but it is an important shift that undermines the idea that racism is the BAME (Black, Asian, and minority ethnic) community's burden to carry. The liberation that this book offers is in the reversal of responsibilities."

Writing for The Guardian, Colin Grant placed the book within a wider tradition of "angry warnings to an ignorant white readership", the majority of which have been produced by African-American rather than Black British writers. Grant opined that "Eddo-Lodge accurately takes the temperature of racial discussions in the UK" but that several sections, such as its discussion of the murder of Stephen Lawrence, are too brief, stating that "this kind of book is not designed to delve beyond the headlines in order to draw lessons from the past".

The book was chosen as number one in a public poll of the "Top Ten Books by Women that Changed the World" in 2018, as part of the Booksellers Association of the UK and Ireland's Academic Book Week.

Reviewing the work for NPR, the journalist Silvia Viñas stated that the work's "boldness" and "straight talk" is what makes it "memorable", also noting that while focusing "on events in Britain, it's still accessible to readers of black American history."

== Awards and recognition ==
- 2017: Longlisted – the Baillie Gifford Prize for Non-Fiction for Why I'm No Longer Talking to White People About Race
- 2018: Longlisted – the Orwell Prize for Political Writing for Why I'm No Longer Talking to White People About Race
- 2018: Jhalak Prize for Book of the Year by a Writer of Colour.
- 2018: British Book Award for narrative non-fiction
- 2018: Winner of public poll of 20 books shortlisted by the UK Booksellers Association for the most influential book written by a woman.
- 2018: Bread and Roses Award for Radical Publishing for Why I'm No Longer Talking to White People About Race (joint winner)

== Sales ==
Following the 2020 murder of George Floyd, Why I'm No Longer Talking to White People About Race became the first book by a Black British writer to reach No. 1 on the Nielsen BookScan's UK top 50 book sales chart.
