= Lenthalls Dam =

Dam in Queensland, Australia

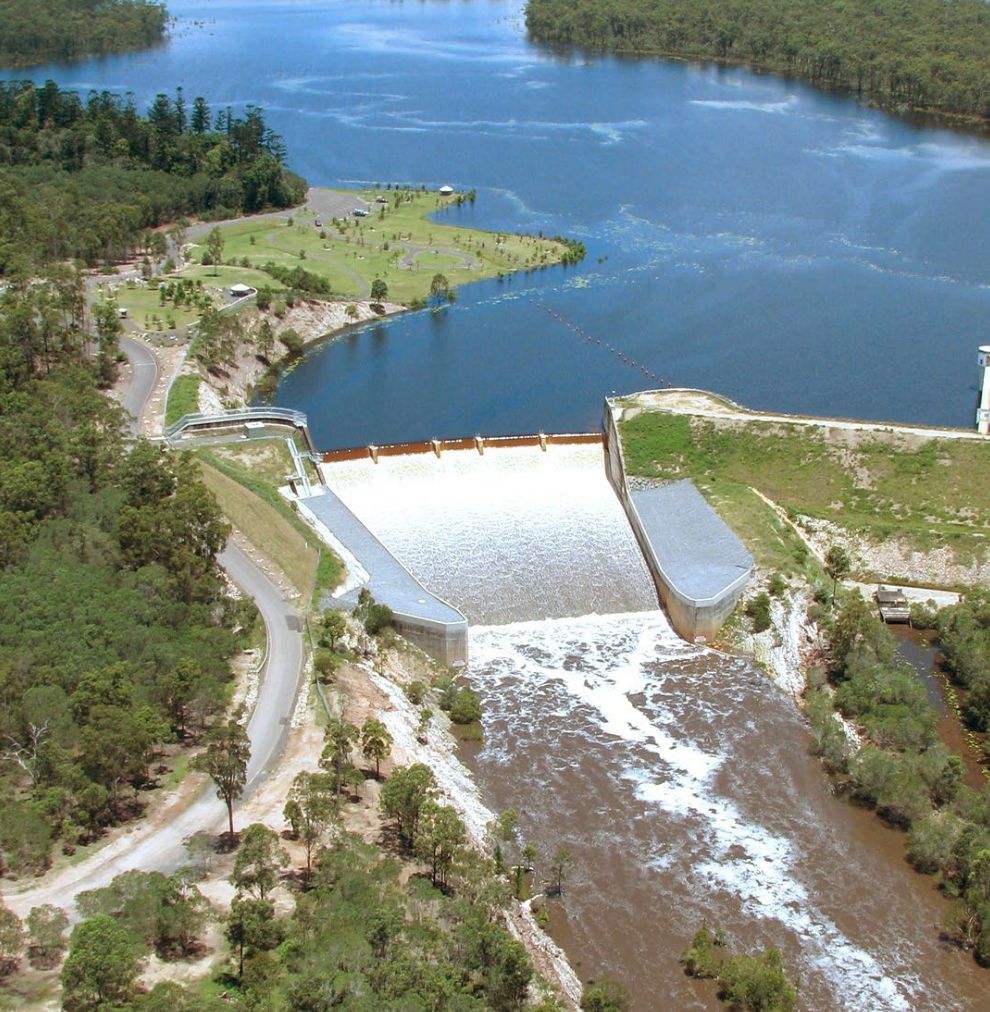
- The dam spillway overflowing in 2017

- Location of the dam in Queensland
- Interactive map of Lenthalls Dam
- Country: Australia
- Location: Maryborough, Fraser Coast, Wide Bay-Burnett, Queensland
- Coordinates: 25°24′04″S 152°31′54″E
- Purpose: Water supply
- Status: Operational
- Opening date: 1984; 2007
- Designed by: GHD Group
- Owner: Fraser Coast Regional Council
- Operator: Wide Bay Water

Dam and spillways
- Type of dam: Embankment dam
- Impounds: Burrum River
- Height (foundation): 31.6 m (104 ft)
- Height (thalweg): 29.6 m (97 ft)
- Length: 445 m (1,460 ft)
- Elevation at crest: 34.6 m (114 ft)
- Width (crest): 6 m (20 ft)
- Dam volume: 28,400×10^{3} m^{3} (1,000×10^{6} cu ft)
- Spillways: 5
- Spillway type: Controlled gates
- Spillway length: 75.3 m (247 ft)
- Spillway capacity: 2,500 m^{3}/s (88,000 cu ft/s)

Reservoir
- Creates: Lake Lenthall
- Total capacity: 28,411 ML (23,033 acre⋅ft)
- Catchment area: 518 km^{2} (200 sq mi)
- Surface area: 766 ha (1,890 acres)
- Maximum length: 9 km (5.6 mi)
- Maximum water depth: 11 m (36 ft)
- Normal elevation: 23 m (75 ft) AHD

The Lenthalls Dam is an earth and rockfill embankment dam across the Burrum River, located near Duckinwilla, on the Fraser Coast, in the Wide Bay-Burnett region of Queensland, Australia. The impounded reservoir is called Lake Lenthall and its main purpose is the supply of potable water for Hervey Bay and surrounding townships within the Fraser Coast Region. The dam is owned by the Council and administered by Wide Bay Water, a council-owned subsidiary.

== History ==
Originally called the Burrum No 3 Dam, the dam and lake were named after the pioneering family in the district.

The Lenthalls Dam was constructed in two stages, with Stage 1 completed in 1984 and Stage 2, completed in 2007, which installed the spillway gates and raised the dam wall by 2 metres (6 ft 7 in). A further upgrade was completed in 2015 and comprised modifications to the spillway gates.

The dam wall is 31.6 metres (104 ft) high and 445 metres (1,460 ft) long. The resultant reservoir has a maximum capacity of 28,411 megalitres (23,033 acre⋅ft) when full and covers 766 hectares (1,890 acres), drawn from a relatively small catchment area of 518 square kilometres (200 sq mi). Due to its small size and an average depth of 4 to 5 metres (13 to 16 ft), it takes a short time in moderate rain events to fill Lake Lenthall to 100% capacity. The spillway comprises five controlled gates with an ogee crest and concrete lined chute, capable of handling 2,500 cubic metres per second (88,000 cu ft/s) of water.

In January 2013 due to heavy rain from ex-Tropical Cyclone Oswald, the lake reached its highest recorded level of 30.4 metres (100 ft), that was 4.4 metres (14 ft) over the spillway.

== Recreation ==
The reservoir is stocked with Australian native fish such as barramundi, bass, golden perch and silver perch under the Queensland Governments stocked impoundment permit scheme. Other aquatic species which inhabit the lake include spangled grunter, saratoga, Krefft's turtle, Flinders Ranges mogurnda, rainbow fish, firetail gudgeon, long finned eel and many more. The lake is home to a myriad of reptiles, insects, bird life and mammals. A Stocked Impoundment Permit is required to fish in the dam.

A significant black-breasted buttonquails reside within the dry vine rain forests on the ridges overlooking Lake Lenthall.

== See also ==
- List of dams and reservoirs in Australia
