= NUS Services Ltd =

NUS Services Ltd (NUSSL) is a company which provides services to student unions in the United Kingdom. NUSSL is owned by over 180 Students' Unions and the National Union of Students (NUS). It has over 220 Students' Unions as purchasing members. The company is run on a democratic basis with its strategy led by its shareholders and its work is directed by a Board and Committees composed of volunteers from its shareholder unions.

Its function is to support unions licensed and retail trade operations as well as providing support services like consultancy and accreditation schemes.

NUSSL is based in Macclesfield.

== History ==
NUS Services started as a purchasing consortium for students' unions in the 1970s. Since then it has expanded and now supports all of students' unions commercial activity.

In May 2023, NUSSL joined the Institute of Environmental Management and Assessment (IEMA) to further its commitment to sustainability. This partnership aims to enhance NUSSL’s approach to environmental management through training and industry networks

== The company ==
NUS has a 25% share in NUS Services and the other 75% share is held by member unions.

The company's Board of Directors is made up of four NUS representatives, five elected officers, an external director and four staff directors from Students' Unions.

The elected Student Committee Members for 2012/13 are:

Non-executive Student Directors

- Chris Dingle, Kingston University Students' Union
- Laura Perry, Newcastle University Students' Union
- Jo Rhodes, Northumbria University Students Union
- Helen Francis, Sheffield Hallam Students' Union
- Sam Bennett, University Campus Suffolk Union
