= Federico Campagna =

Italian philosopher based in London

- Born: 1984 (age 41–42)
- Occupation: philosopher

Federico Campagna (born 1984 in Sondrio) is an Italian philosopher based in London. His recent work revolves around the metaphysical and ethical challenges posed by contemporary nihilism, and the possibility of a fundamental philosophical architecture of emancipation. He holds a PhD from the Royal College of Art (London), an MSc and BSc in Economics and Management of the Arts from Bocconi University (Milan), and an MA in Cultural Studies from Goldsmiths University (London).

He is the author of The Last Night: Antiwork, Atheism, Adventure (Zero Books, 2013), Technic and Magic: the reconstruction of reality (Bloomsbury, 2018), and Otherworlds: Mediterranean Lessons on Escaping History (Bloomsbury, 2025). He is the editor of Franco Berardi Bifo's philosophical anthology Quarant'Anni Contro il Lavoro (Derive/Approdi, 2017) and of What We Are Fighting For (Pluto Press, 2012).

== Bibliography ==
- The Last Night: Anti-Work, Atheism, Adventure (London: Zero Books, 2013)
- Technic and Magic: the Reconstruction of Reality (London: Bloomsbury, 2018)
- Prophetic Culture: Recreation for Adolescents (London: Bloomsbury, 2021)
- Otherworlds: Mediterranean Lessons on Escaping History (London: Bloomsbury, 2025)
