= Lenthall Road Workshop =

Lenthall Road Workshop (LRW) in Hackney, East London was a feminist photography and screen-printing collective that operated from 1975 to 1990.

== History ==
It was founded in 1975 by Chia Moan, Viv Mullett, and Jenny Smith. The workshop was a space for local community members, including many working-class African and Caribbean women and girls, to learn technical skills in printmaking and photography to make art and posters about their lived experiences and as a form of activism. Lenthall Road Workshop was part of a larger movement of grassroots community art workshops in London at that time, including See Red Women's Workshop. Posters created at the workshop have been exhibited at the Hackney Museum and the East End Women's Museum, and are in the collection of the Victoria and Albert Museum.
