= The Government of No One =

2019 book by Ruth Kinna

- First edition
- Subject: Anarchism
- Publisher: Pelican Books
- Publication date: August 2019
- Pages: 432
- ISBN: 9780141984674

The Government of No One: The Theory and Practice of Anarchism is a 2019 book by Ruth Kinna.
