= June Eric-Udorie =

Nigerian-British journalist

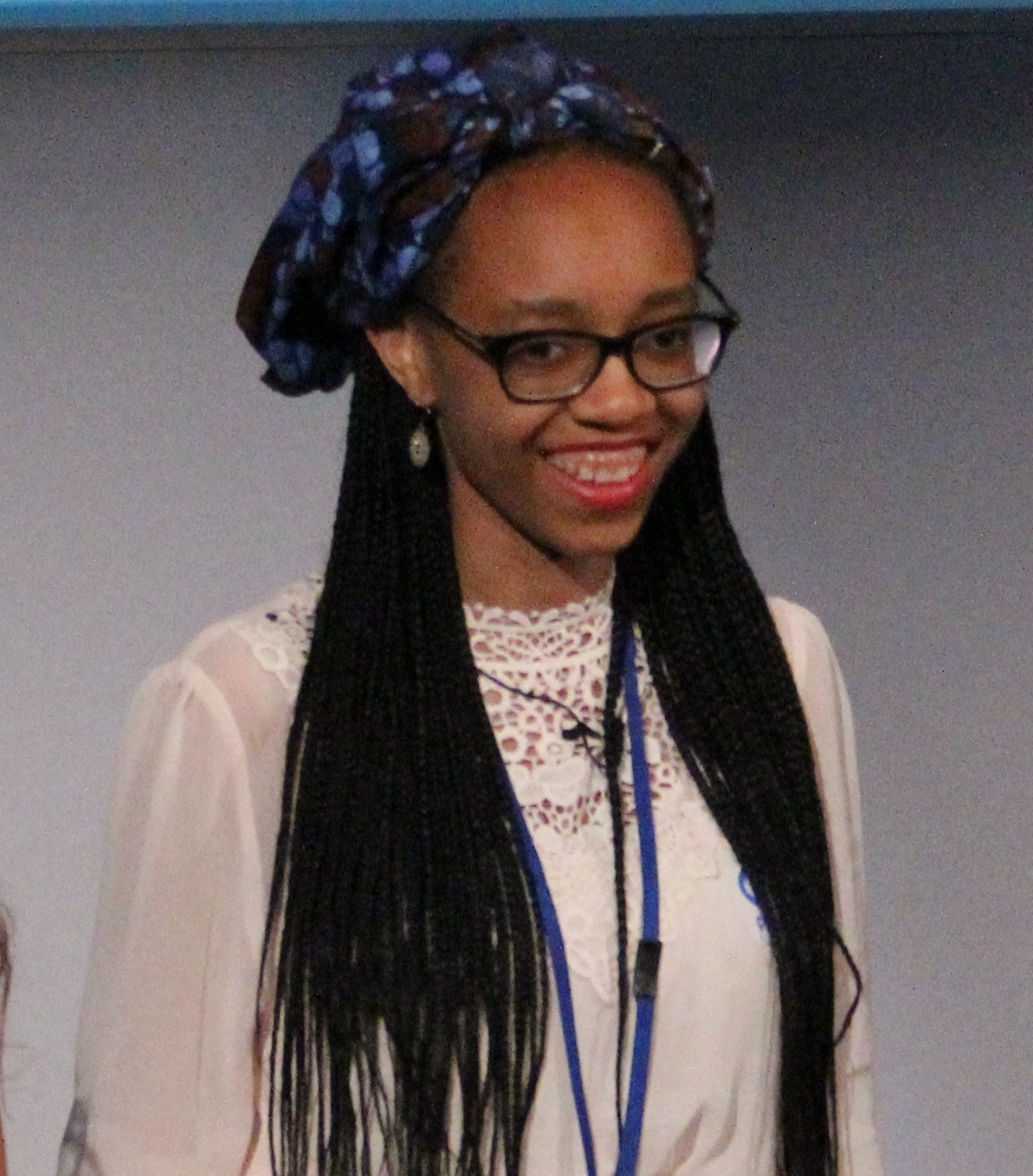
- June Nwando Eric-Udorie as a young moderator of Girl Summit 2014
- Born: 18 June 1998 (age 27); Dublin, Ireland
- Education: Downe House School
- Known for: Feminism, anti-FGM campaigner
- Website: about.me/jericudorie

June Eric-Udorie (born 18 June 1998) is a writer and feminist campaigner based in Great Britain. She is a journalist and blogger for The Guardian and the New Statesman as well as Cosmopolitan. In 2016, the BBC included her in the list of 100 Women for "inspirational and influential women for 2016".

== Early life and work ==
Of Nigerian descent, Eric-Udorie was born in Ireland and is living and working in the United Kingdom, where she moved when she was 10 years old. She attended Downe House School in Thatcham, Berkshire.

Eric-Udorie ran a petition and managed to get the study of feminism added to the A-level politics curriculum in the UK. She is a member of Plan UK’s Youth Advisory Panel and FGM Ambassador for Plan UK with whom she campaigns against female genital mutilation.

Eric-Udorie is the Young Press Officer for Integrate Bristol and was nominated for the Smart Women of the year award by Red magazine in 2015. She was nominated for the Young Commentariat of the Year in 2015 as well as the Words By Women Award in 2015 and the PRECIOUS Awards for Leadership.

She has been selected as a trainee editor for Random House.
