= Joe Glenton =

British ex-soldier (born 1982)

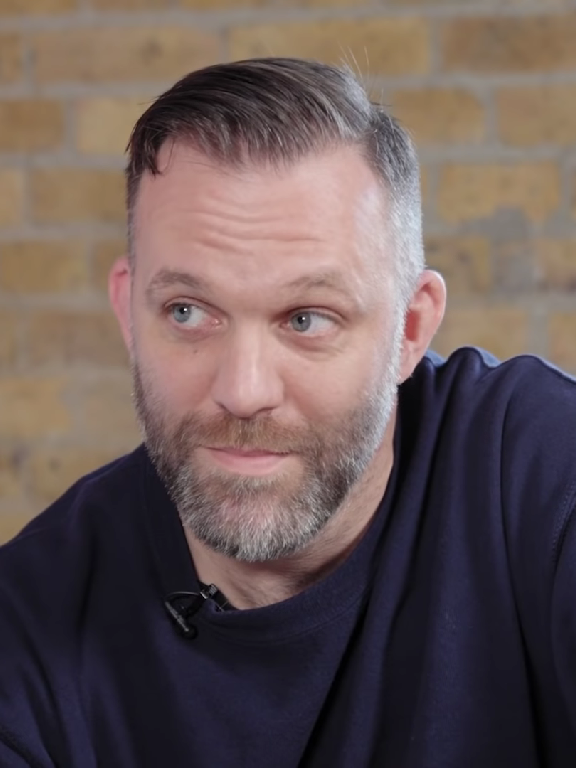
- Glenton on Novara Media in November 2021
- Born: 1982 (age 43–44); Norwich, England
- Education: Leeds Metropolitan University (BA)
- Occupations: Journalist, activist
- Years active: 2007–present
- Spouse: Clare (m. 2009)

Joe Glenton (born 1982) is a British journalist and veteran. He is most famous for serving four months in a military prison in 2010 after going AWOL in Afghanistan and for returning his Veteran's Badge, with both acts in protest of continued British involvement in the Afghan conflict.

== Biography ==
Glenton was born in Norwich and raised in York, joining the military in 2004, allegedly for economic purposes. His mother, Sue, is also an activist. He was based at Dalton Barracks in Oxfordshire and served for one tour of duty in Afghanistan before deserting in 2007 due to being ordered to serve a second tour after half of the suggested break in deployment time. He then fled to southeast Asia and Australia, returning to the UK in 2009 to hand himself in.

He promptly delivered a letter to Downing Street calling for the withdrawal of British troops in Afghanistan and returned to his regimental duties but became under investigation for his desertion. He was sentenced in March 2010 to nine months in a military prison after admitting to going absent without leave, but served only four months before being released in July the same year.

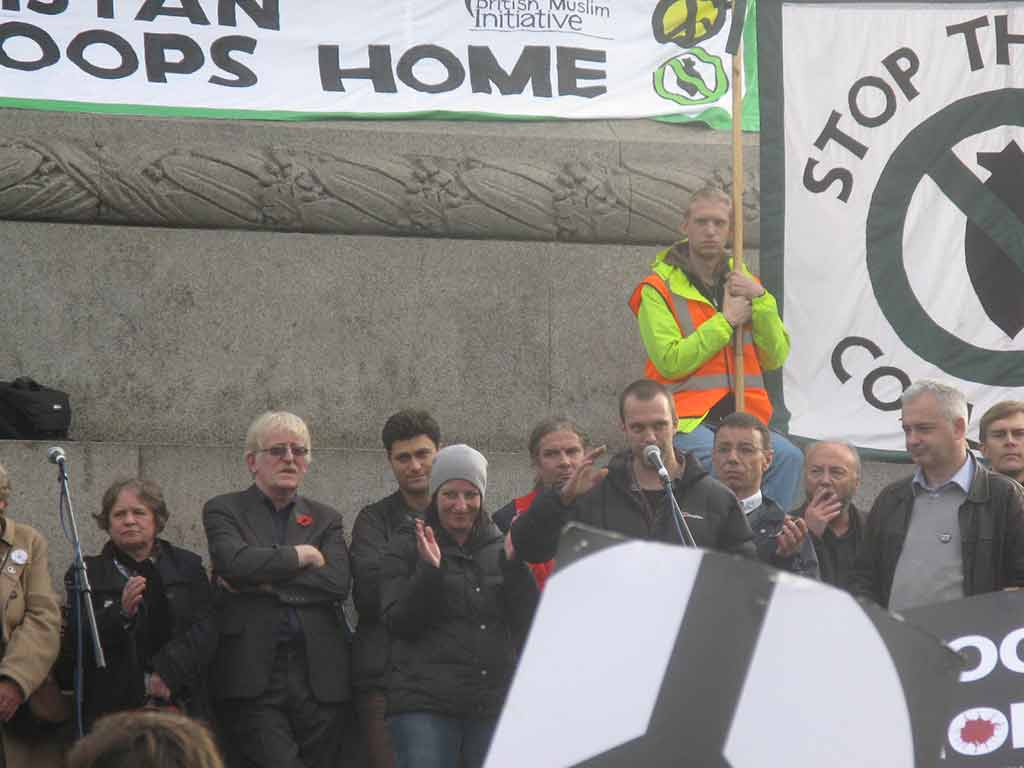
Glenton addressing Troops Out of Afghanistan in London in October 2009

Glenton stated that after fourteen armed forces members were killed in an aircrash in 2006 and having to carry the deceased's coffins by forklift, he was left disillusioned by the war in Afghanistan. Consultant psychiatrist Lars Davidsson suggested that PTSD from events in Glenton's Afghanistan tour may have contributed to his decision to desert.

After being released from prison in 2010, Glenton began studying at the former Leeds Metropolitan University. He also returned his Veteran's Badge in protest of continued British involvement in Afghanistan, stating he wanted troops withdrawn at present rather than what would be five years in the future, according to David Cameron's plan to withdraw British soldiers by 2015.

== Views ==
Glenton is a republican and argued for the abolition of the monarchy after Queen Elizabeth II's death.

He is a member of the Stop the War Coalition and was a member of Veterans for Peace UK until its closure in 2022.

Glenton has criticised the British Armed Forces itself several times. In 2014, this was due to a perceived lack of justice within the army in dealing with sexual harassment offenders. In 2018, he was a critic of a photo of Tommy Robinson, former member of the BNP and former leader of the EDL, surrounded by a group of British soldiers, and a critic of the wider politics within the army, stating "the institution [...] is itself a far-right organisation".

He declared his support for a Palestinian protest march, in favour of a ceasefire in the Gaza war, to proceed on Remembrance Day, labelling Israel an 'apartheid state'. A ceasefire later came into effect on 24 November.

Glenton has written for several newspapers, including Declassified UK, Vice News, The Independent, The Mirror and The Guardian. Since January 2020, he has been an active contributor at Double Down News.

During the 2024 United Kingdom riots, Glenton voiced his opposition against the anti-immigration protesters, calling them far right, fascists, and voiced his opposition to islamophobia. He also called the protesters whole notion of population replacement to be conspiracy theory.

== Personal life ==
In May of 2009, Glenton married his wife Clare who advocated vociferously for his release from military prison.

== Works ==
- Soldier Box: Why I Won't Return to the War on Terror (2013)
- Veteranhood: Rage and Hope in British Ex-Military Life (2021)
