= See Red Women's Workshop =

See Red Women's Workshop was a collective screen printing studio which operated between 1974 and 1990 in London, England. The printing studio was run by a feminist collective and produced material that aimed to combat sexist images of women and contribute towards the visual culture of the Women's Liberation Movement. The workshop was founded by Pru Stevenson, Julia Franco and Suzy Mackie. Over 16 years, more than 40 women joined the workshop. They produced a range of printed material, primarily posters, as well as calendars and t-shirts.

The workshop closed in 1990 due to financial reasons. Partly this was due to changes in the printing industry. Screen printing had become expensive, so the printed material did not cover running costs anymore.

== Themes ==
The themes touched on in the See Red posters were intimately connected with feminist issues, but they ranged widely. They included topics such as reproductive rights, women's refuges, women's liberation, racism, socialist feminism, violence against women, black women's rights, support for jailed women and lesbian rights.

== Funding ==
The workshop was initially funded by the sale of printed material and community donations. These were barely enough to cover the bills, and the workshop often found itself in the position of appealing for funds from the women's movement and individual supporters. Between 1982 and 1986 See Red was funded by the Labour controlled Southwark Council and the newly formed Women's Committee of the Greater London Council. The funding enabled the women to be paid a wage and improve their printing equipment.

== Equipment ==
The initial equipment was simple. Early posters were screen printed using paper stencils or blocking out. These methods were preferred since they needed the minimum of equipment, which ensured that the shop could be set up almost anywhere. By 1978, the workshop had a darkroom and started including photographs in its designs.

== Locations ==
The workshop moved locations several times. It was founded at 18 Camden Road, London, in the shop premises occupied by the Camden Tenants Association. In 1975, it moved to South London Women's Centre, which was located in a squat on Radnor Terrace off South Lambeth Road, Vauxhall. Between 1977 and 1984, the workshop rented premises in Iliffe Yard, a derelict mews off the Walworth Road in South London. The feminist offset-litho printers Women in Print had a workshop opposite and the two groups shared a darkroom. The final move, along with Women in Print was in 1984, to Southwark Council owned premises behind a petrol station in nearby Camberwell Road.

The workshop was attacked on various occasions by the National Front, a fascist and white supremacist political group.

== See also ==
- Women in print movement
