= Frances Ryan =

British journalist and author (born 1985)

Frances Ryan FRSL
- Born: 1985 (age 40–41)
- Education: University of Nottingham
- Occupations: Journalist, author
- Writing career
- Subject: Disability rights movement
- Notable works: Crippled: Austerity and the Demonisation of Disabled People, Who Wants Normal?
- Notable awards: Fellow of the Royal Society of Literature

Frances Ryan FRSL is a British journalist, author, and activist for people with disabilities. In 2021 the Shaw Trust named her one of the UK's ten most influential disabilities activists. Global Citizen called her "a prominent voice for people with disabilities in the media". She is a Fellow of the Royal Society of Literature.

== Early life and education ==
Ryan grew up in Grantham, Lincolnshire, and attended Kesteven and Grantham Girls' School. She has a PhD in politics from the University of Nottingham.

== Career ==
Ryan is a journalist, author, and activist for disabled people. She began writing about disability in 2012 and has written the Hardworking Britain column for The Guardian. She has worked as a political researcher at the University of Nottingham.

Ryan's 2019 book Crippled: Austerity and the Demonisation of Disabled People explored the impacts of the UK austerity programme on disabled people. The book was published by Verso in June 2019. The book inspired the BBC drama Hen Night, which Ryan created with Vici Wreford-Sinnott.

In 2022, she commented on the effects of the COVID-19 pandemic and inflation on disabled people. She argued that many disabled people require extra electricity for medical equipment or extra heat. She said, "If you're chronically ill, you can't go round multiple shops for the cheapest deal."

Ryan's 2025 book Who Wants Normal? is memoir about her life as a disabled woman in Britain, combined with interviews with over 50 well-known of British women and non-binary people with mental and physical health conditions, including Jameela Jamil, Ruth Madeley, Sophie Morgan, Rosie Jones, Fearne Cotton, Emma Barnett, Tanni Grey-Thompson, Marsha de Cordova MP, Ellie Goldstein and Katie Piper. The book explores six aspects of disabled life - education, careers, body image, health, relationships and representation.

== Recognition ==
In 2015 Ryan was awarded the Politics Best Thesis Prize from the School of Politics and International Relations, University of Nottingham. Ryan won the Royal National Institute of Blind People media impact award in 2019.

In 2019 she was shortlisted for the Orwell Prize and in 2020 for the Paul Foot Award.

In 2021 the Shaw Trust named her one of the UK's ten most influential disabilities activists. Global Citizen called her "a prominent voice for people with disabilities in the media". Ryan was appointed a Fellow of the Royal Society of Literature in 2022, due in combination to her authorship of Crippled and her writing for The Guardian.

In 2024 Ryan won the Media Freedom Award for Commentator of the Year - Broadsheet from the Society of Editors.

== Personal life ==
Ryan has generalised muscle weakness and uses a wheelchair. Due to her disability, Ryan was unable to travel for a book tour, so she spoke at online events. For a television interview about her book, she declined a producer's suggestion that she be filmed performing tasks around her house, as she did not think this would have been asked were she not disabled.
