= Huaxi =

Huaxi may refer to:

== Geography ==
- Western China

=== District or subdistrict ===
- Huaxi District (花溪区), a district in Guiyang, Guizhou
- Huaxi Subdistrict, Chongqing (花溪街道), in Banan, Chongqing
- Huaxi Subdistrict, Anshun (华西街道), in Xixiu, Anshun, Guizhou
- Huaxi Subdistrict, Huanghua (骅西街道), in Huanghua, Hebei

=== Town, village, or township ===
- Huaxi, Shaanxi (华西), in Huayin, Shaanxi
- Huaxi, Hongya County (花溪), in Hongya County, Sichuan
- Huaxi, Yunnan (华溪), in Yuxi, Yunnan
- Huaxi Yi and Miao Ethnic Township (花溪彝族苗族乡), in Qianxi County, Guizhou
- Huaxi Township, Hubei (花西乡), in Xiaochang County, Hubei
- Huaxi Township, Sichuan (花溪乡), in Bazhong, Sichuan
- Huaxi Village (华西村), a village in Jiangyin, Jiangsu

== Medical institutions ==
- West China Medical Center (华西医学中心)
- West China Hospital (华西医院)
- West China Second University Hospital (华西第二医院)
- West China Hospital of Stomatology (华西口腔医院)
- West China Fourth Hospital (华西第四医院)
