= Renji Hospital =

Renji Hospital may refer to:

- Renji Hospital of the Shanghai Jiao Tong University School of Medicine
- Sun Yat-Sen Memorial Hospital – Huadu Campus, known as Sun Yat-sen University Renji Hospital before 2024
- West China Hospital, founded as Renji Hospital in 1892
- West China Second University Hospital, founded as Renji Women's Hospital in 1896
- West China School/Hospital of Stomatology, founded as Renji Dental Clinic in 1907
- Yan Chai Hospital, spelled in pinyin as Renji Hospital
