= Huazhen Lin =

Chinese statistician

Huazhen Lin (Chinese: 林华珍) is a Chinese statistician known for her research on survival analysis and nonparametric statistics. She works as a professor of statistics and director of the Center of Statistical Research at Southwestern University of Finance and Economics in Chengdu.

== Education and career ==
Lin studied mathematics at Sichuan University, earning a bachelor's degree in 1989 and master's degree in 1992. She completed a Ph.D. in 1999 in the School of Public Health of the West China University of Medical Sciences, which later merged into Sichuan University.

She worked as an instructor at the University of Electronic Science and Technology of China from 1992 until 1999, when she moved to the College of Mathematics of Sichuan University. After postdoctoral research at the University of Washington in the US from 2003 to 2005, she returned to Sichuan University in 2006 as a full professor. She moved again to Southwestern University in 2010, and became director of the Center of Statistical Research there in 2013.

== Recognition ==
Lin was named a Distinguished Professor in the Changjiang Scholars Program in 2016. In 2021, Lin was named a Fellow of the Institute of Mathematical Statistics, "for outstanding contributions to theory and methods for survival analysis and semiparametric/nonparametric modeling; for dedicated service to the profession; and for strong leadership in statistics education and development in China."
