= Tang Danhong =

Chinese film and documentary director

- 唐丹鸿
- Born: November 1965 (age 60–61); Chengdu, Sichuan, China
- Education: Sichuan University
- Occupations: Film director, poet
- Years active: 1998 - present

Tang Danhong (Chinese: 唐丹鸿; born November 1965) is a poet and film director from mainland China and living in Israel since 2005. Her work has highlighted the lives of the many ethnic minorities in China, including the Tibetans and Uyghurs.

== Early life and education ==
Tang Danhong was born in Chengdu, Sichuan. She graduated from the Library and Information Department of Sichuan University in 1986, and worked in the library of the West China University of Medical Sciences for four years. From 1991 to 1992 she worked in a gallery in Chengdu.

== Career ==
=== Writing ===
In early 1994, Tang opened the Kafka Bookstore in the old city of Chengdu in Renhou Street. This literary bookstore was popular with visitors to the city. Around 1999, the bookstore closed and Tang disappeared from the Chengdu cultural scene, resurfacing in Tel Aviv several years later. A collection of poems she wrote in China during this period (1992–2002) were published in 2012 as X-ray, Sweet Night (Chinese: X光的、甜蜜的夜) in 2012.

Tang's writing has frequently appeared China Digital Times. In 2008, she published an essay about her feeling as a Han Chinese person about Tibet. In 2010 she traveled to India to collect oral histories from elderly Tibetan exiles. In 2019 she interviewed Nimrod Baranovitch of the University of Haifa about detained Uyghur poet Ablet Abdurishit Berqi.

=== Film ===
Tang was the director of Chengdu Vientiane Documentary Film Production Company. Her first documentary film Tsurphu Monastery (Chinese: 楚布寺) was filmed in February 1998. Her major works include Dzachuka (Chinese: 扎溪卡), Nyma the Conqueror (Chinese: 降神者尼玛), At the Gate of Reincarnation-Tibetan Funeral Customs (Chinese: 在轮回之门--藏族人的丧葬习俗), Top Adventure-98 Yarlung Zangbo River Rafting Adventure (Chinese: 顶级探险---98雅鲁藏布江漂流探险), Nightingale, Not the Only Voice (Chinese: 夜莺不是唯一的歌喉, 2000).Nightingale follows the lives of three artists in Chengdu and conveys their feelings of oppression in the modern market economy.

== Personal life ==
Tang divorced in 2001. She later met an Israeli man studying Chinese medicine. They married and moved to Israel in late 2005. There, Tang taught Mandarin at Tel Aviv University.

=== Views on Tibet ===
When discussing the Chinese Communist Party's repression against Tibet, Tang argued that it would only push more Tibetans to advocate for autonomy and even independence from the central government.

"Tibet is disappearing. The spirit which makes her beautiful and peaceful is disappearing. She is becoming us, becoming what she does not want to become. What other choice does she have when facing the anxiety of being alienated? To hold onto her tradition and culture, and revive her ancient civilization? Or to commit suicidal acts which will only add to Han nationalists’ bloody, shameful glory?"
