= West China Fourth Hospital =

Public hospital in Chengdu, Sichuan, China

- West China Medical Center

Geography
- Location: Chengdu, Sichuan, China

Organisation
- Type: Specialist
- Affiliated university: Sichuan University

Services
- Standards: Grade III, Class A
- Speciality: Occupational medicine

History
- Founded: 1976; 50 years ago

Links
- Website: wcfh.com.cn
- Lists: Hospitals in China

West China Fourth Hospital (WCFH; operating as the West China School of Public Health for tertiary education) is a public specialist hospital for occupational medicine in Chengdu, Sichuan, China. It is owned and operated by the West China Medical Center of Sichuan University.

The hospital specializes in the prevention, diagnosis, and treatment of occupational diseases. It is the only Grade-III, Class-A occupational-disease specialist hospital among the hospitals directly supervised by China's National Health Commission.

== History ==
The academic origins of the West China School of Public Health are traced by Sichuan University to the public-health teaching group established at the medical school of West China Union University in 1914. A peer-reviewed review of public-health education in China notes that West China Union University's medical school was among the small number of Chinese universities offering public-health programs before 1949. In 1955, its successor, Sichuan Medical College, was one of six institutions that established independent departments of public health as China developed a national system of public-health higher education.

West China Fourth Hospital was established in 1976, and the West China School of Public Health was formally established in 1986. The hospital and the public health school operate as one institution. When the West China University of Medical Sciences merged with Sichuan University in 2000, the institution became part of the newly formed West China Medical Center of Sichuan University.

== Clinical services ==
The hospital combines medical treatment with prevention, rehabilitation, teaching, and research. Occupational medicine has historically been its principal specialty; its occupational-disease department has been designated a national key clinical specialty. Other areas emphasized by the institution include geriatrics, palliative care, poisoning and emergency treatment, and minimally invasive clinical services.

In 2011, the Sichuan provincial government entrusted the hospital to establish and operate the Sichuan Provincial Institute for Occupational Disease Prevention and Control (四川省职业病防治院). The institution's role in occupational health extends beyond clinical treatment to professional training, research, and participation in occupational-disease prevention programs. The hospital has also served as a provincial and municipal center for the treatment of chemical poisoning and as a Chengdu treatment center for occupational poisoning and radiation injury.

== Tertiary education and research ==
For higher education, the institution operates as the West China School of Public Health. Its teaching and research encompass public health and preventive medicine, including epidemiology and biostatistics, environmental and occupational health, nutrition and food hygiene, health inspection, and related fields. The school offers undergraduate, master's, and doctoral degree programs, as well as having postdoctoral research programs.

In 2020, Sichuan University was selected by the Ministry of Education and the National Health Commission as one of the participating institutions in a national program for training high-level applied public-health professionals. The school was subsequently included in China's program for developing high-level schools of public health.

== See also ==
- Sichuan University
- West China Medical Center
- West China Hospital
