= Yan Yude =

Chinese billionaire

Yan Yude is a Chinese billionaire whose fortune derives from his stake in Virscend, a Chinese private education firm. He graduated from Sichuan University and resides in Chengdu.
