= Yang Keng =

Chinese billionaire

Yang Keng is a Chinese billionaire whose fortune derives from his stake in Sichuan Languang Development. He began in auto parts before transitioning into real estate. He resides in Chengdu, and attended Sichuan University.
