= Sichuan University Sports Centre =

Sports venue in Chengdu, China

Coordinates: 30°37′50″N 104°04′56″E

Sichuan University Sports Centre (Simplified Chinese: 四川大学体育中心) is a multi-use stadium in Sichuan University, Chengdu, Sichuan, China. It is currently used mostly for football matches. The stadium's capacity is 10,000 people.
