= Journal of the West China Border Research Society =

- Volume I, 1922–1923
- Discipline: Multidisciplinary
- Language: English
- Edited by: James Huston Edgar; David Crockett Graham; Leslie Gifford Kilborn

Publication details
- History: 1922–1945
- Publisher: West China Border Research Society (Republican China)
- Frequency: Biannually, triannually, annually

Standard abbreviations
- ISO 4: J. West China Border Res. Soc.

Indexing
- OCLC no.: 977595689

The Journal of the West China Border Research Society (JWCBRS) was a scientific journal published at irregular intervals between 1922 and 1945 by the West China Border Research Society, and printed by the Canadian Methodist Mission Press. It was the first English-language journal published in Sichuan.

== History and overview ==
The West China Border Research Society was formed on 24 March 1922 at the West China Union University, in the Chengdu home of Dr. William Reginald Morse, who became the first President of the Society. Most of its founding members were Protestant missionaries, including Morse himself. The first formal meeting of the Society was held in October 1922 in the home of Albert James Brace, a Canadian Methodist missionary and Master of the Szechwan Lodge № 112, who was elected as Secretary of the Society. In addition to Morse and Brace, the first members of the Society also included Joseph Beech (AMEM), George Bradford Neumann (AMEM), Daniel Sheets Dye (ABFMS), Clarence L. Foster (ABFMS), David Crockett Graham (ABFMS), Dryden Linsley Phelps (ABFMS), James Huston Edgar (CIM), John R. Muir (CIM), T. Edgar Plewman (CMM), James Livingstone Stewart (CMM), Edward Corry Wilford (CMM), Earl Dome (YMCA), George G. Helde (YMCA) and H. N. Steptoe.

The Journal of the West China Border Research Society was originally published on a biannual basis, except for Volume III (1926–1929), before becoming an annual publication in 1932 (Volume V). Since the publication of Volume XII (1940), the JWCBRS was divided into two categories, with Series A covering general subjects and Series B devoted to the natural sciences. The purpose of the Journal was to report on the "investigations into the country, peoples, customs and environment of West China, especially as they affect the non-Chinese", and to promote the study of "the life and customs, the religion and sociology, the enthology and anthropology, and other problems related to the various aboriginal races that inhabit the border lands of Western China". Members of the Society were expected to travel at least once every three years, into the tribal regions, and to there investigate some phase of the life of the district.

The emphasis fell on the exploration of the border region between Western Sichuan and Eastern Tibet, and the tribal people-inhabited region of Southern Sichuan. But due to the increasing state of lawlessness and banditry and the difficulty in travelling into these border regions, the scope of the Society's activities was enlarged to include the study of all problems peculiar to the land and life of Western China, either Chinese or Aboriginal. Alex McKay wrote in Revue d'Études Tibétaines that "the West China Border Research Society was not the first of its kind, [...] but the JWCBRS was the first journal of its kind".

Most of the articles published in the JWCBRS can be divided into seven categories by discipline, namely, archaeology, ethnology, geography and geology, medicine and pharmacy, religious studies, study of history, and botany and zoology. Significant contributors included James Huston Edgar, author of numerous articles especially concerning the Tibetan region; David Crockett Graham, who did research on the Chuan Miao people and the 1937 volume is largely devoted to his studies of this group; Thomas Torrance, who was particularly interested in the Qiang people; Vyvyan Donnithorne, who wrote a long article for Volume VI (1933–1934) detailing his investigation on the East Syriac Christian tradition in Guanghan (Hanchow); and W. Brian Harland's "On the Physiographical History of Western Szechwan" for the 1945 volume. In addition, the Journal also published articles by non-missionary scholars, such as Joseph Rock and Alexandra David-Néel.

== See also ==
- Protestantism in Sichuan
- Protestantism and science
- The West China Missionary News
- Category:Ethnic groups in Sichuan
- Category:Natural history of Sichuan
- Armand David — a botanist-zoologist Catholic missionary in Sichuan, discoverer of the pandas
