= Zhang Xingdong =

Chinese biomedical engineer

- 张兴栋
- Born: April 1938 (age 88); Nanchong, Sichuan, China
- Education: Sichuan University
- Scientific career
- Fields: Biomedicine
- Workplaces: Sichuan University

Chinese name
- Traditional Chinese: 張興棟
- Simplified Chinese: 张兴栋
Transcriptions
Standard Mandarin
- Hanyu Pinyin: Zhāng Xīngdòng

Zhang Xingdong (Chinese: 张兴栋; born April 1938) is a Chinese biomedical scientist and professor at Sichuan University. He is the President of the International Union of Societies for Biomaterials Science and Engineering (IUSBSE), and Honorary President of the Chinese Society for Biomaterials (CSBM).

== Biography ==
Zhang was born in Nanchong, Sichuan, in April 1938. After high school in 1960, he studied, then taught, at what is now Sichuan University.

In 2007 he was elected an academician of the Chinese Academy of Engineering (CAE). On February 6, 2014, he was elected a foreign associate of the US National Academy of Engineering (NAE).

In March 2017, he received the honorary doctorate of science from Macao University of Science and Technology.

== Selected papers ==
- Y. Sun; W. Zou; S.Q. Bian; Y.H. Huang; Y.F. Tan; J. Liang; Y.J. Fan; X.D. Zhang (2013). "Bioreducible PAA-g-PEG Graft Micelles with High Doxorubicin Loading for Targeted Antitumor Effect Against Mouse Breast Carcinoma". Biomaterials. 34 (28): 6818–28. doi:10.1016/j.biomaterials.2013.05.032. PMID 23764117.
- C.F. Tan; Z.H. Sun; Y.L. Hong; Y.Y. Li; X.S. Chen; X.D. Zhang (2013). "Reverse-Biomineralization Assembly of Acid-Sensitive Biomimetic Fibers for Hard Tissue Engineering and Drug Delivery". Journal of Materials Chemistry B. 1 (30): 3694–3704. doi:10.1039/c3tb20274g. PMID 32261267.
- Y. Sun; Y.H. Huan; S.Q. Bian; J. Liang; Y.J. Fan; X.D. Zhang (2013). "Reduction-degradable 13 PEG-b-PAA-b-PEG Triblock Copolymer Micelles Incorporated with MTX for Cancer Chemotherapy". Colloids and Surfaces B: Biointerfaces. 112: 197–203. doi:10.1016/j.colsurfb.2013.07.056. PMID 23981981.
- X.Q. Yang; L.Q. Guo; Y.J Fan; X.D. Zhang (2013). "Preparation and Characterization of Macromolecule Cross Linked Collagen Hydrogels for Chondrocyte Delivery". International Journal of Biological Macromolecules. 61: 487–493. doi:10.1016/j.ijbiomac.2013.07.021. PMID 23916642.
- J. Wang; H.J Zhang; X.D. Zhu; H.S. Fan; Y.J. Fan; X.D. Zhang (2013). "Dynamic Competitive Adsorption of Bone Related Proteins on Calcium Phosphate Ceramic Particles with Different Phase Composition and Microstructure". Journal of Biomedical Materials Research Part B: Applied Biomaterials. 6: 101.
