= Liu Yingming =

Chinese mathematician and politician (1940–2016)

Liu Yingming 刘应明
- Born: 8 October 1940; Fuzhou, Fujian, China
- Died: 15 July 2016 (aged 75); Chengdu, Sichuan, China
- Education: Peking University
- Children: 1
- Scientific career
- Fields: Fuzzy mathematics, Topology

Liu Yingming (Chinese: 刘应明; pinyin: Liú Yìngmíng; 8 October 1940 – 15 July 2016) was a Chinese mathematician. He was an academician of the Chinese Academy of Sciences (CAS).

== Biography ==
Liu graduated from Peking University in 1963, majoring in mathematics. He was assigned to Sichuan University after his graduation. His research field was topology and fuzzy mathematics, mainly in the algebra problem of unclear topology, embedded theory and nonclear convex sets. Liu was the deputy president of Sichuan University between 1989 and 2005. He was elected an academician of the Chinese Academy of Sciences in 1995. Liu joined Jiusan Society in 1995. He was the vice chairman of the central committee of Jiusan Society from 1997 to 2007.

Liu was diagnosed as leukemia in November 2015. He died on 15 July 2016 at the age of 75 in Chengdu.
