= Huaxi, Shaanxi =

Huaxi 华西镇
- Town
- Location in China
- Coordinates: 34°36′45″N 109°56′36″E
- Country: People's Republic of China
- Province: Shaanxi
- Prefecture-level city: Weinan
- County-level city: Huayin
- Time zone: UTC+8 (China Standard)

Huaxi (simplified Chinese: 华西; traditional Chinese: 華西; pinyin: Huáxī) is a town of Huayin, Shaanxi, China. As of 2018, it has one residential community and nine villages under its administration.
