= Huaxi, Hongya County =

Huaxi 花溪镇
- Town
- Location in Sichuan
- Coordinates: 29°45′35″N 103°13′27″E
- Country: People's Republic of China
- Province: Sichuan
- Prefecture-level city: Meishan
- County: Hongya County
- Time zone: UTC+8 (China Standard)

Huaxi (Chinese: 花溪; pinyin: Huáxī) is a town of Hongya County, Sichuan, China. As of 2018, it has one residential community and eight villages under its administration.
