= Western China =

Geographical and cultural region in China

Western China

Western China (中国西部 or 华西) is the west of China. It consists of Southwestern China and Northwestern China. In the definition of the Chinese government, Western China covers six provinces (Sichuan, Guizhou, Yunnan, Shaanxi, Gansu, and Qinghai), three autonomous regions (Tibet, Ningxia, and Xinjiang), and one direct-administered municipality (Chongqing).

== Urbanization ==
As part of the Xi Jinping administration's goal to urbanize 250 million citizens by 2025 as the first phase of a long-term green modernization plan, China seeks to resettle formerly rural people in provincial capitals, prefectural cities, and county-level towns in western China (as well as central China).

== Administrative divisions ==
GB	ISO No.	Province	Chinese Name	Capital	Population	Density	Area	Abbr.	
Yú	50	Chongqing Municipality	重庆市; Chóngqìng Shì	Chongqing	28,846,170	350.50	82,300	CQ	渝
Chuān (Shǔ)	51	Sichuan Province	四川省; Sìchuān Shěng	Chengdu	80,418,200	165.81	485,000	SC	川(蜀)
Guì (Qián)	52	Guizhou Province	贵州省; Gùizhōu Shěng	Guiyang	34,746,468	197.42	176,000	GZ	贵(黔)
Yún (Diān)	53	Yunnan Province	云南省; Yúnnán Shěng	Kunming	45,966,239	116.66	394,000	YN	云(滇)
Zàng	54	Tibet Autonomous Region	西藏自治区; Xīzàng Zìzhìqū	Lhasa	3,002,166	2.44	1,228,400	XZ	藏
Shǎn (Qín)	61	Shaanxi Province	陕西省; Shǎnxī Shěng	Xi'an	37,327,378	181.55	205,600	SN	陕(秦)
Gān (Lǒng)	62	Gansu Province	甘肃省; Gānsù Shěng	Lanzhou	25,575,254	56.29	454,300	GS	甘(陇)
Qīng	63	Qinghai Province	青海省; Qīnghǎi Shěng	Xining	5,626,722	7.80	721,200	QH	青
Níng	64	Ningxia Hui Autonomous Region	宁夏回族自治区; Níngxià Huízú Zìzhìqū	Yinchuan	6,301,350	94.89	66,400	NX	宁
Xīn	65	Xinjiang Uyghur Autonomous Region	新疆维吾尔自治区; Xīnjiāng Wéiwú'ěr Zìzhìqū	Ürümqi	21,813,334	13.13	1,660,400	XJ	新

== Cities with urban areas over one million in population ==
Provincial capitals in bold.

#	City	Urban area	District area	City proper	Prov.	Census date
1	**Chongqing** (Note: Chongqing core area only, satellite urban areas separated from Chongqing core area is not included. Chongqing core districts are consist of nine districts: Yuzhong, Dadukou, Jiangbei, Shapingba, Jiulongpo, Nan'an, Beibei, Yubei, & Banan.)	8,894,757	12,084,385	16,044,027	CQ	2010-11-01
2	**Chengdu**	6,316,922	7,415,590	14,047,625	SC	2010-11-01
3	**Xi'an**	5,206,253	6,501,190	8,467,838	SN	2010-11-01
4	**Kunming** (Note: Dongchuan is a satellite urban area separated from Kunming and it is not included.)	3,140,777	3,272,586	6,432,209	YN	2010-11-01
5	**Ürümqi**	2,853,398	3,029,372	3,112,559	XJ	2010-11-01
6	**Guiyang**	2,520,061	3,034,750	4,322,611	GZ	2010-11-01
7	**Lanzhou**	2,438,595	2,628,426	3,616,163	GS	2010-11-01
8	**Yinchuan**	1,159,457	1,290,170	1,993,088	NX	2010-11-01
9	**Xining**	1,153,417	1,198,304	2,208,708	QH	2010-11-01
10	Mianyang	967,007	1,355,331	4,613,871	SC	2010-11-01
11	Nanchong	890,402	1,858,875	6,278,614	SC	2010-11-01
12	Baoji	871,940	1,437,802	3,716,737	SN	2010-11-01
13	Wanzhou	859,662	1,563,050	see Chongqing	CQ	2010-11-01
14	Luzhou	742,274	1,371,233	4,218,427	SC	2010-11-01
15	Xianyang (Note: Yangling is a satellite urban area separated from Xianyang and it is not included.)	730,704	945,420	5,096,001	SN	2010-11-01
16	Hechuan	721,753	1,293,028	see Chongqing	CQ	2010-11-01
17	Zunyi	715,148	1,094,871	6,127,082	GZ	2010-11-01
18	Luzhou	742,274	1,371,233	4,218,427	SC	2010-11-01
19	Jiangjin	686,189	1,233,149	see Chongqing	CQ	2010-11-01
20	Leshan	678,752	1,211,237	3,235,759	SC	2010-11-01
21	Zigong	666,204	1,262,064	2,678,899	SC	2010-11-01
22	Panzhihua	631,258	787,177	1,214,121	SC	2010-11-01
23	Fuling	595,224	1,066,714	see Chongqing	CQ	2010-11-01
24	Neijiang	586,445	1,251,095	3,702,847	SC	2010-11-01
25	Xuanwei	584,076	1,302,891	see Qujing	YN	2010-11-01
26	Yongchuan	582,769	1,024,708	see Chongqing	CQ	2010-11-01
27	Suining	549,826	1,295,885	3,252,619	SC	2010-11-01
28	Yibin	549,650	836,340	4,471,896	SC	2010-11-01
29	Tianshui	544,441	1,197,174	3,262,549	GS	2010-11-01
30	Deyang	530,122	735,070	3,615,758	SC	2010-11-01
*	**Lhasa**	199,159	279,074	559,423	XZ	2010-11-01

== Policies ==
China's current development policy for its western regions is laid out in the Guiding Opinions of the Central Committee of the Communist Party of China and the State Council on Promoting the Development of the West in the New Era and Forming a New Pattern. This policy seeks to improve key industries and national development, particularly in aircraft manufacturing. The Belt and Road Initiative has aimed to reduce the economic imbalance between western China and the country's more developed eastern region.

== See also ==
- Northwestern China
- Southwestern China
- West China Union College
- West China Union University

Other regions

- East China
- North China
- Northeast China
- Northern and southern China
- South Central China
