= Huaxi Township, Sichuan =

Huaxi Township 花溪乡
- Township
- Location in Sichuan
- Coordinates: 31°48′53″N 107°3′37″E
- Country: People's Republic of China
- Province: Sichuan
- Prefecture-level city: Bazhong
- District: Bazhou District
- Time zone: UTC+8 (China Standard)

Huaxi Township (simplified Chinese: 花溪乡; traditional Chinese: 花溪鄉; pinyin: Huāxī Xiāng) is a township under the administration of Bazhou District, Bazhong, Sichuan, China. As of 2018, it has one residential community and 11 villages under its administration.
