= William Reginald Morse =

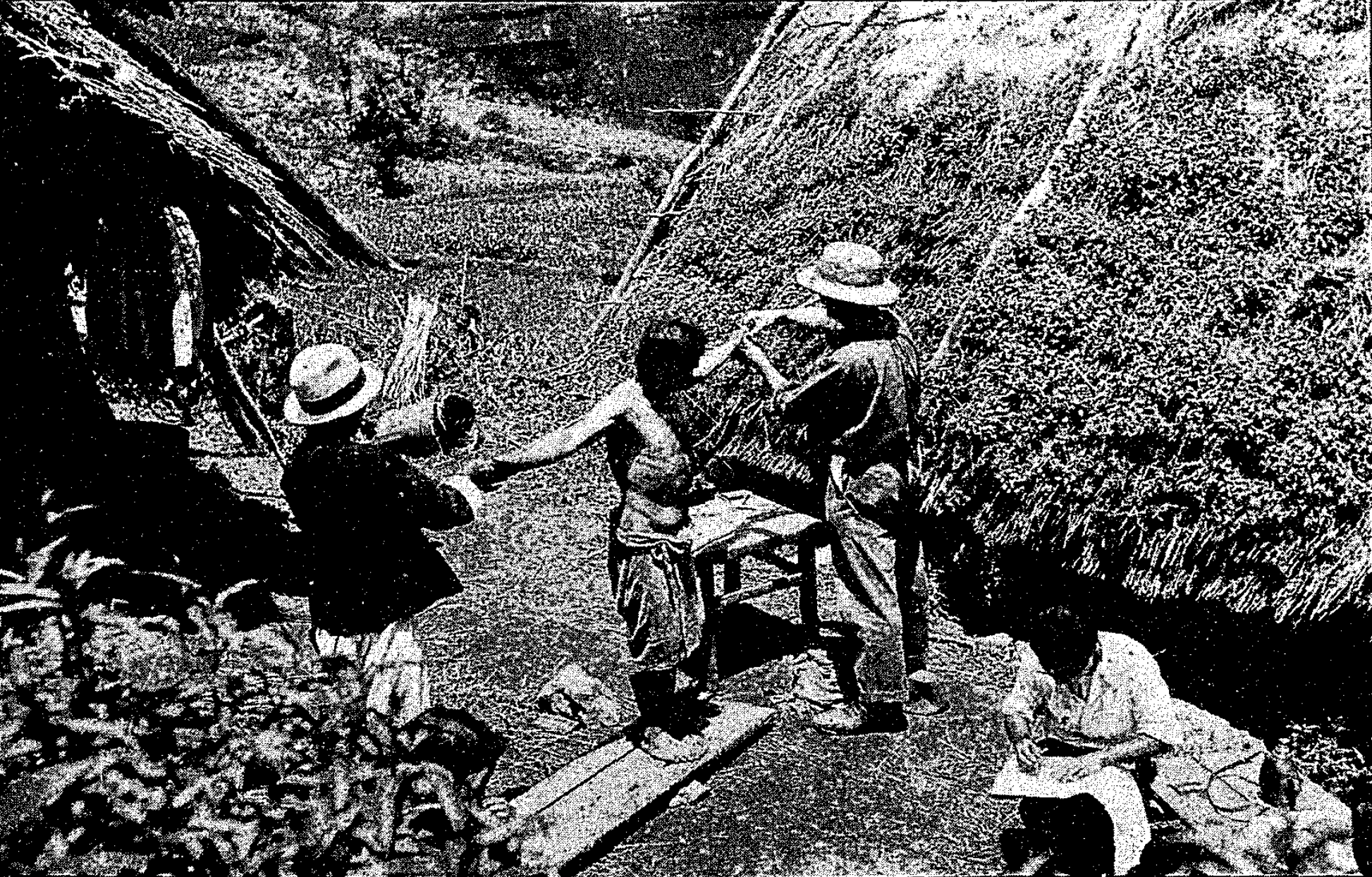
- Dr. W. R. Morse at work in Miaoland, making physical measurements on a member of the Hua Miao race near Shimenkan, Weining, Guizhou Province.
- Born: August 30, 1874; Lawrencetown, Nova Scotia, Canada
- Died: November 11, 1939 (aged 65)
- Education: McGill University
- Occupations: Medical Doctor, Author, Medical Missionary
- Spouse: Anna Crosse Kinney (married 1903)
- Children: 1

William Reginald Morse (30 August 1874 – 11 November 1939) was a Canadian author, medical doctor, and medical missionary serving under the American Baptist Foreign Mission Society in Sichuan, West China. In 1901 he proceeded to West China where he founded West China Union University. The university was one of the first co-educational medical schools in China that provided western education. Morse also made substantial contributions to the fields of anthropology and medical history through his published works. Morse provided historical insight to the West on the traditional practices of Chinese and Tibetan Medicine. Morse specifically delineated the influence of religion and culture in the evolution of medicine in East Asia. Additionally, Morse wrote several anthropological books that outlined the physical and physiological behavior of the people of Sichuan and Tibet. Morse was interested not only in understanding the vast differences in culture between China and the West, but also communicating these differences to the West.

== Background and family life ==
Ellen Marry Fitch and Leander Rupert Morse married in 1871. Ellen gave birth to three children named: Leander Rupert Morse (1871), William Reginald Morse (1874), and Harriet Rosamond Morse (1877). William Morse was born in the Province of Nova Scotia in a small village called Lawrencetown. After receiving his medical degree, Morse went into private practice in Rhode Island and Nova Scotia. However, in 1901, Morse joined the ranks of the medical missionaries. William Morse married Anna Crosse Kinney in 1903; the couple had one daughter, Marjorie, born in 1913.

== Education and research ==
Morse received his B.A. from Acadia University (1897) and medical degree from McGill University (1902). He then went on to do postgraduate work at Harvard University, Johns Hopkins University, and the University College of London. Morse was invested in his education, receiving a B.A., M.D., C.M, F.A.C.S., L.L.D, and F.R.G.S. In 1930 Morse was appointed research assistant at the Peabody Museum where he studied the anthropomorphic trends of Chinese and Tibetans for nearly a decade. Additionally, Morse was the first president of the West China Border Research Society, and did much during his early days of the society to maintain interest in its growth and development.

== Contributions to the medical field ==
=== West China Union University ===
Morse is most regarded for his work done in Chengdu. He and a few other medical doctors founded a medical school at the West China Union University, and he eventually became dean of the medical school and co-chair of the Medical-Dental College. He also held positions at the Union University's Baptist College. As of 2000, the university had graduated a total of 35,884 students. The school was awarded the title of "National Advanced Group in College Students' Social Practice" by the Propaganda Department of the CPC Central Committee, Ministry of Education and Youth League Central Committee two years in succession. Also, the university was declared by the Government as one of the one hundred key universities to receive major government support and concern for the 21st century under the "211 Project".

== Scholarly writings about East Asian medical practices ==
Morse Published five works relating to the history and practice of Medicine in China and Tibet. In his book "Chinese Medicine", Morse chronicles the last 500 years of Chinese Anatomy, Surgery, Acupuncture, Diseases, and Diagnosis. Morse thought the story of Chinese Medicine was unique, interesting, very intricate, and needed to be told to the West. In his book "Tibetan Medicine", Morse outlines the "primitive health practices" performed at the border of Tibet and China. Morse writes, "The Tibetans believe that a man who has been bad in this life, may cause disease after death… As far as I can discover, medicine is not differentiated from other priestly functions as a separate profession". Morse was an outlet for the West, providing them with information about traditional medical practices in East Asia. Morse's work on Chinese Medicine has been published in the Clio series of Medical historical monographs, and has been hailed as the best brief account of Chinese medicine in the English language.

== Research in anthropology ==
In 1928 Morse published "Observations on the Anthropology of the Peoples of the West Chino-Tibetan Borderland: The Marches of the Mantsi". In this scientific journal, Morse writes about the geography, political status, typical customs, religion, and the psychology of the people. Morse writes,"Geographical influences determine to a great extent the characteristics of peoples, and peculiarly so in the regions under discussion… The civilization encourages and creates a religion of superstition and magic, and is it not reasonable that the minds of these primitive folk are filled with the mystery and power and awe of the unseen?" Morse came to the conclusion that the Tibetan mind was overwhelmed by the phenomena of nature, and that the Tibetans were compelled to submit powerlessly to the "phenomena of sense". Morse went on to publish three other writings on Tibet and the Sichuan Province. Morse was able to gather information on the physical anthropological characteristics and physiological characteristic of the West Chino-Tibetan Borderland, which helped provide a better understanding of East Asia to the West. Additionally, Morse published a journal article called "Schedule of Physical Anthropological Measurements and Observations on Ten Ethnic Groups of [Sichuan] Province, West China." David Crockett Graham believed that, "The measurements [in this article]...Should be of great value to anthropologists, and materially contribute towards a solution of the problem of physical differences between the various ethnic groups in West China". Later on, Morse became a research assistant at the Peabody Museum, where he studied the anthropomorphic trends of Chinese and Tibetans for nearly a decade. He was able to pool donations together with his connection with Reverend David Crockett Graham for the medical anthropology at the Peabody.

== Medical missions ==
In 1909 Morse decided to pursue humanitarian efforts in China. Morse felt obliged to help the people of China. He noted, "[The] Health and economic conditions are so bad and the medical procedures so diverse and inefficient in China and indigenous practitioners so incapable and unqualified that one can hardly speak or write on the subject impassively. No mockery or ridicule is intended but one is filled with pity and desire to help". Initially Morse controlled a small missionary hospital in Sichuan for a few years. Later Morse was sent to the capital, Chengdu, where he helped found a medical school in 1914.

== Role of religion ==
Morse was a devout Christian who thought Christianity was the resolution to any needs for the human body, and for the entire civilization. In 1928 Morse wrote a book entitled "The Three Crosses in the Purple Mists: An Adventure in Medical Education under the Eaves of the Roof of the World." In the book he evaluates the relationship between religion and medical education in China. Morse writes, "Christ himself was the most striking Healer the world has ever seen. His medical work was an example and perhaps the chief attraction of His Ministry. In attempting to follow His example we have at the Union University consecrated our work in Medicine". Morse believed that Western education should be synthesized with Christian doctrine. At China Union University, Morse secured Christian teachers whenever he could. Morse wanted all physicians to be actuated by the love of Christ in all their ministrations. In 1915, Morse and the other founders helped create a faculty for religion.

== West China Union University ==
The university was founded in 1914 next to the city of Chengdu, and is still present to this day. The creation of the school manifested from the fact that Morse realized that missions in West China were unable to provide educational opportunities. The university was established through the joint efforts of missionary organizations from the United States, Britain and Canada. The mission of the school was," the advancement of the Kingdom of God by means of higher education in West China under Christian auspices". Dr. O. L. Kilborn, Dr. R. G. Kilborn, and Dr. William Reginald Morse played key roles in its formation. In 1914 there was only one medical building that was 30 by 15 ft. There also were five staff members in 1914, Drs. C. W. Service, H. W. Irwin, H. L. Canright, W. R. Morse, and O. L. Kilborn. Morse taught Anatomy and Surgery at the school, and eventually became the second dean of the faculty in 1919. His wife, Mrs. W.R. Morse had been connected with the school since its foundation, and helped teach Anatomical Drawing. Morse believed in weeding out the weaker students, and its first class only graduated two students. The first 4 or 5 years the university had no average annual budget besides the $200 salary for the teachers. As Morse noted, "The University suffered from poverty, lack of equipment, deficiency in staff, and inadequate teaching rooms". However, in 1924, the WCUU opened enrollment to women and became the first co-educational university inland. The medical school has expanded greatly, and in 1985 changed its name to West China University of Medical Sciences. As of June 2000, the university had eight schools: School of Basic Medicine, School of Stomatology, School of Medicine, School of Nursing, School of Public Health, School of Pharmacy, School of Continuing Education, School of Forensic Medicine.

== Published works ==
- The Practices and Principles of Chinese Medicine - 1926
- A Memorandum on the Chinese Procedure of Acupuncture - 1926
- The Three Crosses in the Purple Mists: An Adventure in Medical Education under the Eaves of the Roof of the World - 1928
- Observations on the Anthropology of the Peoples of the West Chino-Tibetan Borderland: The Marches of the Mantsi - 1928
- Tibetan Medicine - 1929
- the Nine Field Seasons of Anthropomorphic Studies of Tibetans, Chinese in Schwezan, and non-Chinese tribes of western China - 1931
- Chinese Anatomy - 1934
- Schedule of Physical Anthropological Measurements and Observations on Ten Ethnic Groups of Szechwan Province, West China - 1937
- Chinese Medicine - 1934
- Blood Groups of the Aboriginal Chʻwan Miao of Szechwan Province, West China - 1938

== Late life and death ==
In 1924 Morse left West China Union University, and devoted his time writing about the history and practice of Chinese medicine. In 1939, Morse died at the age of 65.

The papers of William and Anne Morse are held by the Yale University Archives, as are the papers of their daughter, Marjorie Morse Crunden.

== See also ==
- Baptist Christianity in Sichuan
