= West China Second University Hospital =

Teaching hospital in Chengdu, Sichuan, China

- West China Medical Center

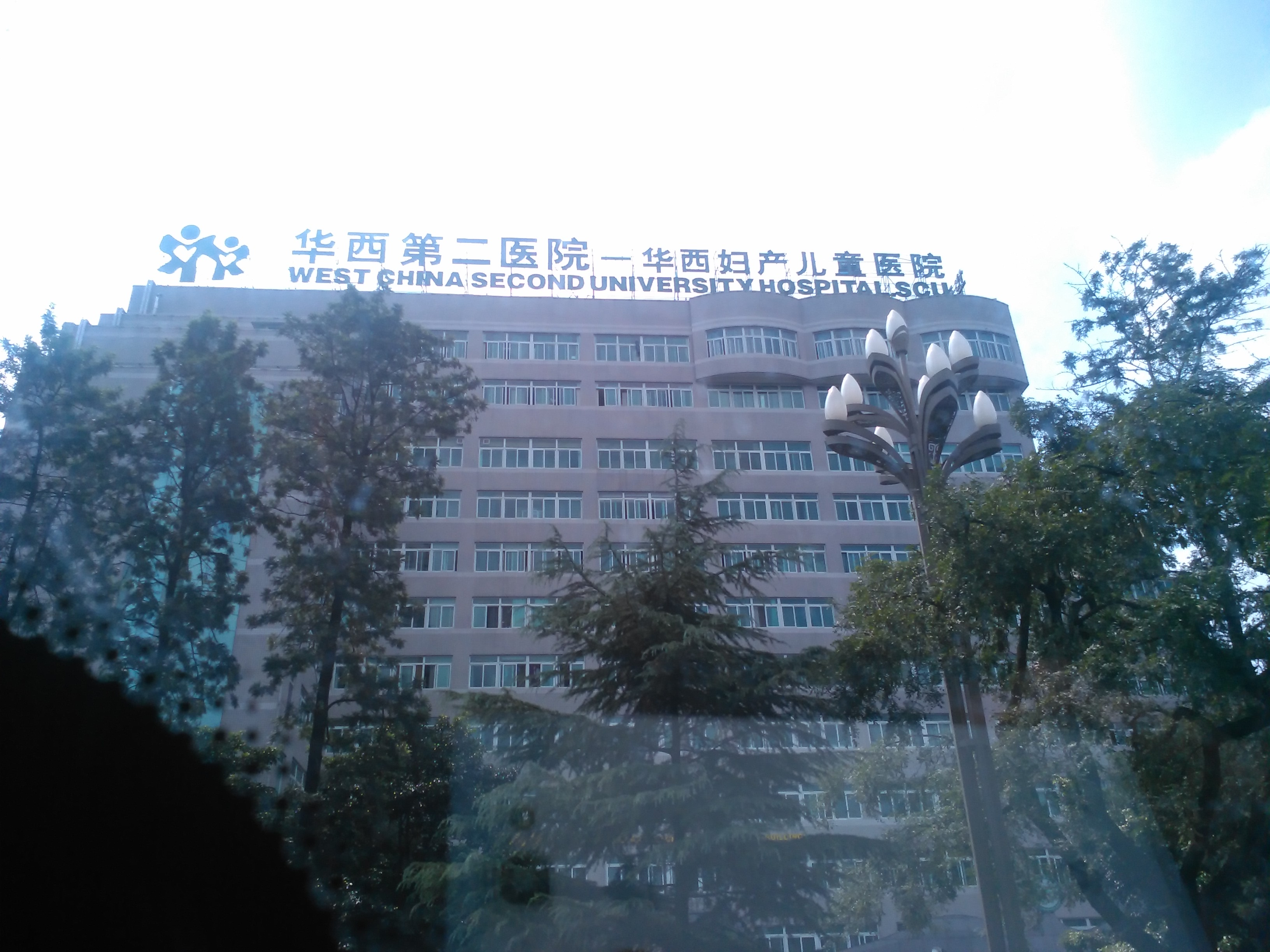
- Hospital in 2015

Geography
- Location: Chengdu, Sichuan, China

Organisation
- Care system: Public
- Type: Teaching, specialist
- Affiliated university: Sichuan University

Services
- Beds: 2,100

History
- Founded: 1988; 38 years ago

Links
- Website: en.motherchildren.com
- Lists: Hospitals in China

West China Second University Hospital (四川大学华西第二医院), concurrently known as West China Women's and Children's Hospital (四川大学华西妇产儿童医院), is a public tertiary specialist and teaching hospital in Chengdu, Sichuan, China. Owned and operated by the West China Medical Center of Sichuan University, it specializes in obstetrics, gynecology, pediatrics, neonatology, reproductive medicine, and other areas of maternal and child health.

The hospital's institutional history is traced to the Renji Women's Hospital established in Chengdu in 1896. The modern hospital developed from the obstetrics and gynecology and pediatrics departments of the West China Hospital. The Ministry of Health of China approved their separation to form a second affiliated hospital in 1987, and the institution became an independent hospital in 1988. Following the 2000 merger of the West China University of Medical Sciences into Sichuan University, the hospital took its present Sichuan University affiliation and name.

The institution operates two principal campuses in Chengdu, the Huaxi campus and the Jinjiang campus. It has 2,100 licensed beds and 52 clinical and medical-technical departments. In 2020, the National Health Commission designated it as the National Children's Regional Medical Center for Southwestern China. The hospital also houses national programs concerned with birth-defect monitoring and maternal and child health surveillance.

== History ==
=== Origins ===
The hospital traces its historical roots to the development of Western-style women's and children's medicine in Chengdu in the late nineteenth century. In 1896, Canadian medical missionary Retta Gifford Kilborn established a hospital for women in Chengdu that became known as Renji Women's Hospital (仁济女医院). The institution subsequently became connected with West China Union University and, by 1914, served as a site for clinical teaching and practical training.

Women's and children's clinical services continued within the institutions that later became the West China University of Medical Sciences. The immediate predecessors of the present hospital were the obstetrics and gynecology and pediatrics departments of the university's affiliated hospital.

=== Formal establishment ===
In 1987, the Ministry of Health of China approved the separation of the obstetrics and gynecology and pediatrics departments of the West China Hospital to form the Second Affiliated Hospital of the West China University of Medical Sciences, also known as the West China Women's and Children's Hospital. The hospital began operating independently in 1988.

The hospital was designated a WHO Baby-Friendly Hospital in 1993 and was among the first specialist maternity-and-children's hospitals in China to receive Grade III-A status in 1998. Grade III-A is the highest grade within China's hospital classification system.

In September 2000, the West China University of Medical Sciences merged with Sichuan University, becoming the university's West China Medical Center. The hospital subsequently adopted the name West China Second University Hospital, while retaining West China Women's and Children's Hospital as an alternative institutional name.

=== Expansion ===
Expansion beyond the original Huaxi campus resulted in the development of the Jinjiang campus in eastern Chengdu. Construction preparations began in the early 2010s; a groundbreaking ceremony was held in December 2012 and a construction ceremony in November 2014. The new campus began trial outpatient operations in June 2018. An opening ceremony was held on 29 June, and full operations began on 2 July 2018. The Jinjiang campus substantially expanded the hospital's capacity in obstetrics, gynecology and pediatric care. At its opening, more than 20 clinical service areas in those fields were operating there.

In September 2024, the High-tech Zone Women's and Children's Hospital of the West China Second University Hospital began seeing patients. The hospital was built by the Chengdu High-tech Zone Management Committee and placed under entrusted management by West China Second University Hospital.

== Campuses ==
West China Second University Hospital has two principal campuses in Chengdu.

- The Huaxi campus is at No. 20, Section 3, Renmin South Road, Chengdu. It is located within the traditional West China medical district associated with Sichuan University's health-sciences institutions.
- The Jinjiang campus is at No. 1416, Section 1, Chenglong Avenue, Chengdu. It opened fully in 2018 as a major expansion of the hospital's clinical capacity.

The two campuses together have 2,100 licensed beds and 52 clinical and medical-technical departments. The hospital identifies obstetrics and gynecology and pediatrics as national key disciplines. Its National Clinical Key Specialty projects cover areas including gynecology, obstetrics, neonatology, reproductive medicine, pediatric respiratory and immunological disease, pediatric infectious disease, pediatric neurology, pediatric cardiology, ultrasound medicine and oncology.

The hospital reported 4.374 million outpatient and emergency visits, approximately 115,000 inpatient discharges and about 25,800 deliveries in 2025.

== Medical education and research ==
West China Second University Hospital has undergraduate, postgraduate, specialist, residency, and postdoctoral programs in obstetrics and gynecology and pediatrics, alongside its clinical functions. The hospital is also a national training base for the standardization of residency and specialist-physician training programs in those disciplines.

Research at the hospital is concentrated on reproductive and developmental medicine, maternal and child health, pediatrics and related biomedical sciences. In 1987, the Ministry of Health of China entrusted West China to establish and operate the National Center for Birth Defects Monitoring of China (中国出生缺陷监测中心), concurrently known as the National Office for Maternal and Child Health Surveillance (全国妇幼卫生监测办公室). Since then, operating China's birth-defect surveillance system became a major public-health function of the hospital. In 2009, the center covered more than 1.3 million births for national hospitals and more than 3.6 million births for provincial hospitals. The center's surveillance data have subsequently been used in epidemiological studies of congenital anomalies and perinatal health in China. The hospital also hosts the Key Laboratory of Birth Defects and Related Diseases of Women and Children of the Ministry of Education (出生缺陷与相关妇儿疾病教育部重点实验室).

The hospital also performs national information-management functions in the prevention of thalassemia. In 2023, the National Health Commission established the National Collaborative Network for Thalassemia Prevention and Control (全国地中海贫血防控协作网), comprising 101 medical institutions in ten provinces. Xinhua reported that West China Second University Hospital was designated as the network's national information-management support institution, while hospitals in Guangdong and Guangxi served as the national clinical lead institutions.

== National and regional roles ==
=== National Children's Regional Medical Center ===
In August 2020, the National Health Commission designated the hospital as the National Children's Regional Medical Center for Southwest China. The hospital has also been entrusted by the Commission to play a leading role in preventing and treating serious childhood illnesses, managing children's health, improving care for complex and critical cases, and advancing pediatric healthcare, education, research, and preventive services, and standardizing pediatric medical practices throughout Southwestern China.

=== Provincial Children's Hospital ===
The Sichuan provincial government entrusted West China Second University to fully operate the Sichuan Provincial Children's Hospital (四川省儿童医院), also known as the West China Second University Hospital Tianfu Hospital (四川大学华西第二医院天府医院). The hospital, located in Meishan, was designated as a national regional medical-center project and began clinical operations in December 2022. In 2024, the China Central Television reported that 13 clinical disease centers had been established, and 38 new clinical technologies and projects had been transferred from West China Second University Hospital to the Meishan institution.

=== Primary-care network ===
In May 2017, West China Second University Hospital led the formation of the West China Women and Children Alliance (华西妇儿联盟), a network intended to connect the hospital with maternal-and-child health institutions and primary-care facilities in remote areas in Sichuan. Its work includes tiered referral, physician training, and standardization of women's and children's health services.

Xinhua reported in September 2024 that the network had expanded to 10 county-level maternal-and-child health hospitals and 170 primary medical institutions. It had conducted 29 rounds of training and certification involving 343 physicians in participating institutions. A training center for primary medical institution physicians, the West China Maternal and Child Medical Research and Development Center, was subsequently established at the hospital on the basis of the network in 2024.

=== Hospital in Tibet ===
In October 2021, by the order of the Chinese central government, West China Second University Hospital established the West China Second University Hospital Tibet Women's and Children's Hospital (四川大学华西第二医院西藏自治区妇产儿童医院) in Lhasa, Tibet. It is the first specialized hospital for women and children in the entire region of Tibet, which is known for high altitudes. West China Second University sent physicians, medical administrators, and other specialists to Lhasa, while Tibetan medical professionals received training in Chengdu. The Tibet hospital was also designated as a national regional medical-center project.

== See also ==
- West China Hospital
- West China Medical Center
- Sichuan University
- Healthcare in China
