= West China Medical Center =

Academic medical center in Chengdu, Sichuan, China

West China Medical Center, Sichuan University
- 四川大学华西医学中心
- Former names: West China Union University (1910–1951); West China University (1951–1953); Sichuan Medical College (1953–1985); West China University of Medical Sciences (1985–2000)
- Motto: 仁智、忠勇、清慎、勤和 (Chinese)
- Type: Public
- Established: March 11, 1910 (116 years ago)
- Parent institution: Sichuan University
- President: Yanrong Li 李言荣
- Location: Chengdu, Sichuan, China; 31.555161°N 105.995727°E
- Campus: Urban
- Website: wcums.scu.edu.cn

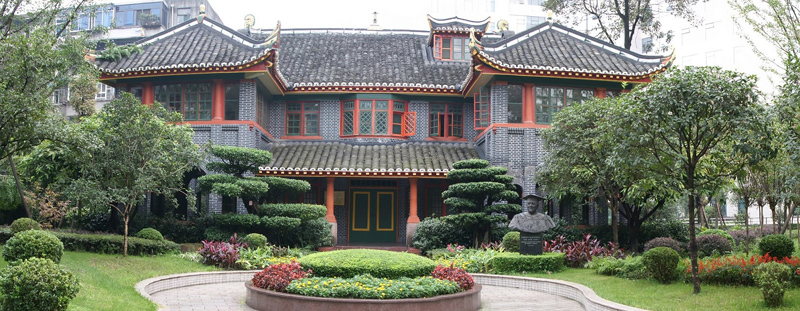
Museum of the West China College of Stomatology, which has a 100-year history

The West China Medical Center, Sichuan University (四川大学华西医学中心), formerly the West China University of Medical Sciences (WCUMS; 华西医科大学), is the academic medical center and healthcare system of Sichuan University in Chengdu, Sichuan, China.

The center's teaching wing consists of five professional schools: the School of Basic Medical Sciences and Forensic Medicine, the School of Public Health, the School of Stomatology, the School of Clinical Medicine and Nursing, and the School of Pharmacy (each prefixed with "West China"). The center's clinic wing consists of four principal teaching hospitals, among other associated teaching hospitals: the West China Hospital, the West China Second University Hospital, the West China Hospital of Stomatology, and the West China Fourth Hospital.

The institution was founded as the private West China Union University (華西協合大學) by Western missionaries in 1914, being the earliest modern comprehensive university with medical sciences education in China. It once conducted dual-degree MD, DMD, BA, and BS programs with the State University of New York since 1920s and 1930s. In 1938, the university was accredited by the United States' National Board of Medical Examiners. As of 1949, the university held four colleges specializing in arts, science, medical sciences, and dentistry, with 26 academic departments, 2 professional studies departments, and 7 affiliated teaching hospitals.

In 1951, after the Chinese Civil War, the Sichuan Provincial People's Government took over the university, renaming it as the public West China University (華西大學). Under a higher education institution reformation plan directed by the Central People's Government of China, the university was deprived of other academic departments and turned into Sichuan Medical College (四川医学院) with sole focus on medical studies in 1953. The college was upgraded as the West China University of Medical Sciences (华西医科大学) in 1985. Under another reformation ordered by the State Council, the university was incorporated into Sichuan University in 2000 and named the West China Medical Center, Sichuan University.

The institution is now sponsored by the Ministry of Education of China. The West China Hospital, Sichuan University (the institution's principal affiliated teaching hospital) is consistently ranked in the top 3 hospitals in China and the largest comprehensive hospital in the world.

== History ==
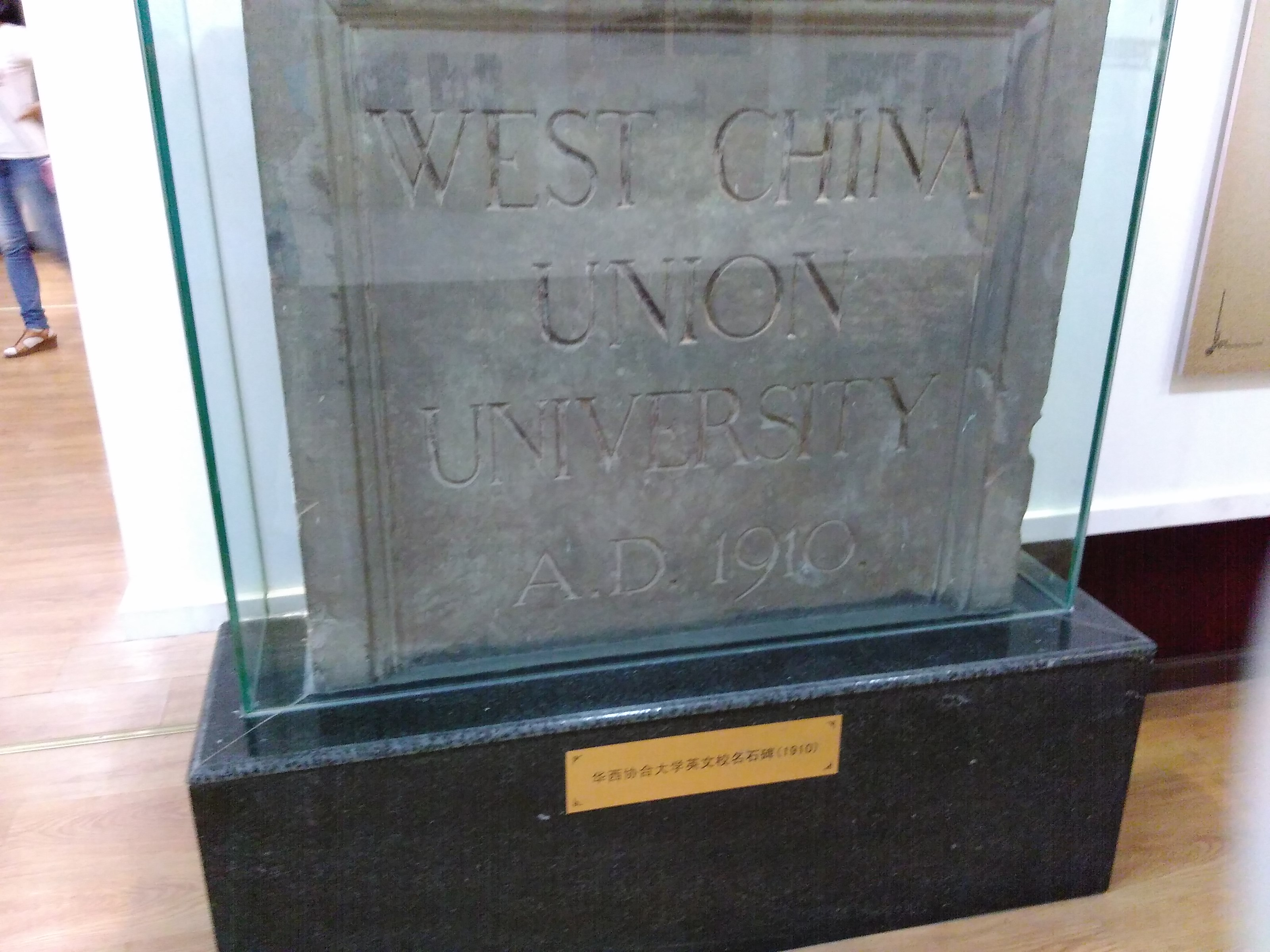
The stele with the words "West China Union University" inscribed on it

The West China Union College was co-founded by American Baptist Foreign Mission Society, American Methodist Episcopal Mission, Friends' Foreign Mission Association and Canadian Methodist Mission in 1910. Dr. O. L. Kilborn, Dr. R.G. Kilborn, and Dr. William Reginald Morse played key roles in its formation. The university's medical school was founded in 1914 and taught basic medicine and clinical medicine, biomedicine and stomatology. Three years later the school became the first to teach dentistry in China. In 1924 women were admitted to the college as a whole. Helen Yoh was the first woman to graduate medical school.

On September 23, 1933, West China Union University was registered with the Provincial Board of Education. In 1941 the East-West Cultural Agency, a foreign exchange student program for distinguished scholars and staff members, was created with the University of Cambridge and Oxford University.

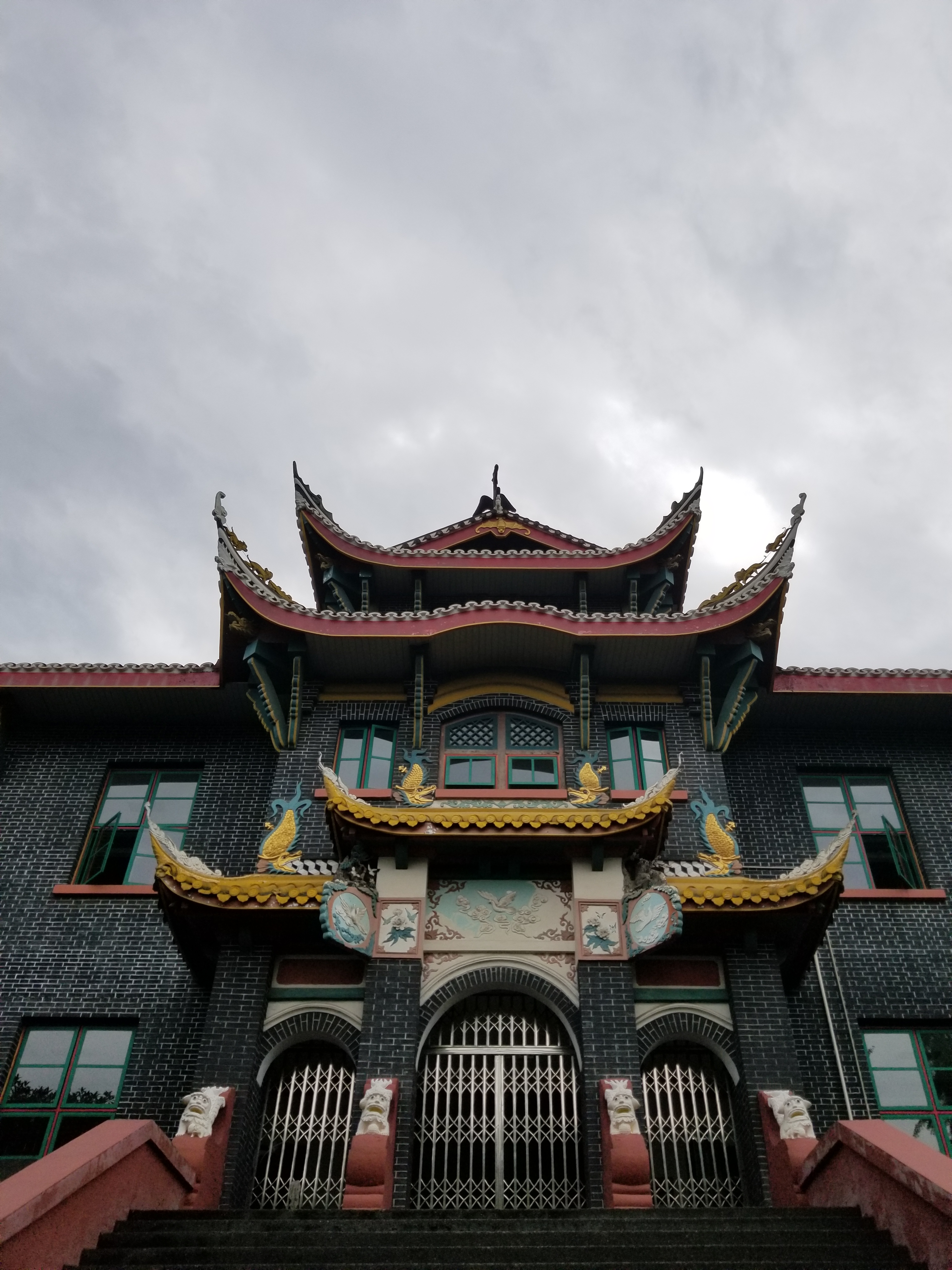
Historical campus building

In 1951 the school was renamed to West China University and then to Sichuan Medical College in 1953. In 1985 the school changed its name to West China University of Medical Sciences. It merged with Sichuan University in 2000 and became the West China Medical Center of Sichuan University.

== Overview ==
West China Medical Center of Sichuan University is situated in Chengdu, in the downtown area on the banks of Jin River. As one of the top five medical schools in China, the Center consists of five schools:

- West China School of Basic and Forensic Medicine
- West China School of Medicine
- West China School of Stomatology
- West China School of Public Health
- West China School of Pharmacy

The Center consists of four principal teaching hospitals, among other affiliated and associated hospitals:

- West China Hospital
- West China Second University Hospital (West China Women's and Children's Hospital)
- West China Hospital of Stomatology
- West China Fourth Hospital

The center offers bachelor, masters and doctorate degrees. Of more than 3,000 students, about one half of the students are in the bachelor's program and the rest are in the advanced programs.

According to China's University and College Admission System, in 2012 the center was an A level rated school and the only Cochrane Center or "evidence based medical center" in Asia. It is one of only 15 of such centers in the world. The Implementation of the project has won a national prize from the Ministry of Education.

=== Partnerships ===
West China Medical Center of Sichuan University is a member of the Institute for International Medical Education (IIME), INCLEN (International Clinical Epidemiology Network) and International Network of universities.

West China Medical Center of Sichuan University has cooperative agreements with 150 universities from 43 countries and regions such as the US, the UK, Canada, the Netherlands, Japan, Germany, Finland, Taiwan, Hong Kong and Australia. This includes University of Washington, UCLA, University of Michigan and 10 other universities from the US, Glasgow University and 2 others from the UK, and Waseda University, Hiroshima University and University of Yamanashi from Japan.

=== Recognition ===
West China Medical Center of Sichuan University is listed in the World Directory of Medical schools published by WHO, The International Medical Education Directory (IMED), Educational Commission for Foreign Medical Graduates (ECFMG) and the Foundation of International Medical Education and Research (FAIMER).

== Affiliated hospitals ==
West China Medical Center of Sichuan University has four affiliated hospitals.

- West China Hospital of Sichuan University is the largest hospital in China and the largest single-site hospital in the world and is consistently ranked in the top three hospitals in China. West China Hospital has 36 clinical departments, 15 medical technology departments and 25 open laboratories. In 2011, more than 3.5 million patients visited the outpatient department, 173,000 patients were discharged from inpatient departments, and more than 93,900 operations were performed. There are 4,300 beds. The hospital employs 6100 permanent staff of which 550 are professors or associate professors. The hospital offers 31 programs leading to doctorate degrees, doctorate programs in clinical medicine and post-doctoral programs in clinical and basic medicines. The hospital has 1 state laboratory, 2 key laboratories of the Ministry of Education, 9 key disciplines of Ministry of Education, 2 disciplines with the national "211 Project", 5 key programs of Ministry of Health, 16 key disciplines and 25 provincial level key laboratories.
- West China Second University Hospital, also known as West China Women's and Children's Hospital of Sichuan University, is a specialist and teaching hospital for maternal and child health. It was founded in 1988 on the basis of Department of Gynecology and Obstetrics and the Department of Pediatrics in the West China Hospital. West China Women's and Children's Hospital is under the immediate supervision of Ministry of Health of China. The title "Baby Friendly Hospital" was awarded by the Ministry of Health and WHO. The hospital contains China Birth Defect Monitoring Center, the Prenatal Research Center and the Emergency Center for Acute Respiratory Tract Infection in Children. It was Awarded the "Top Tertiary Hospital" in 1998. West China Women's and Children's Hospital's ob/gyns and pediatrics is rated as National Key Disciplines. The staff consists of 406 members of whom 61 are professors, 78 are associate professors. In 2011 the hospital served 3.5 million outpatients and emergency patients and performed 22,500 surgeries and 7600 deliveries.
- West China Hospital of Stomatology of Sichuan University was founded in 1985. It is considered the cradle of modern stomatology in China. The hospital annually serves 400,000 patients in outpatients clinics and 3000 patients in inpatients wards. The hospital has a capacity of 220 dental chairs and its staff consists of 507 staff members.
- West China Fourth Hospital is the only specialized hospital for occupational diseases among all the medical universities in China.

== Notable alumni ==
- Xia Liangcai, a noted oral medicine educator and one of the founders.

== See also ==
- Protestantism in Sichuan
  - Anglicanism in Sichuan
  - Methodism in Sichuan
- Wuhan University
- Tongji Medical College, Huazhong University of Science and Technology
