= West China Hospital =

Public hospital in Chengdu, Sichuan China

West China Hospital West China School of Medicine
- West China Medical Center

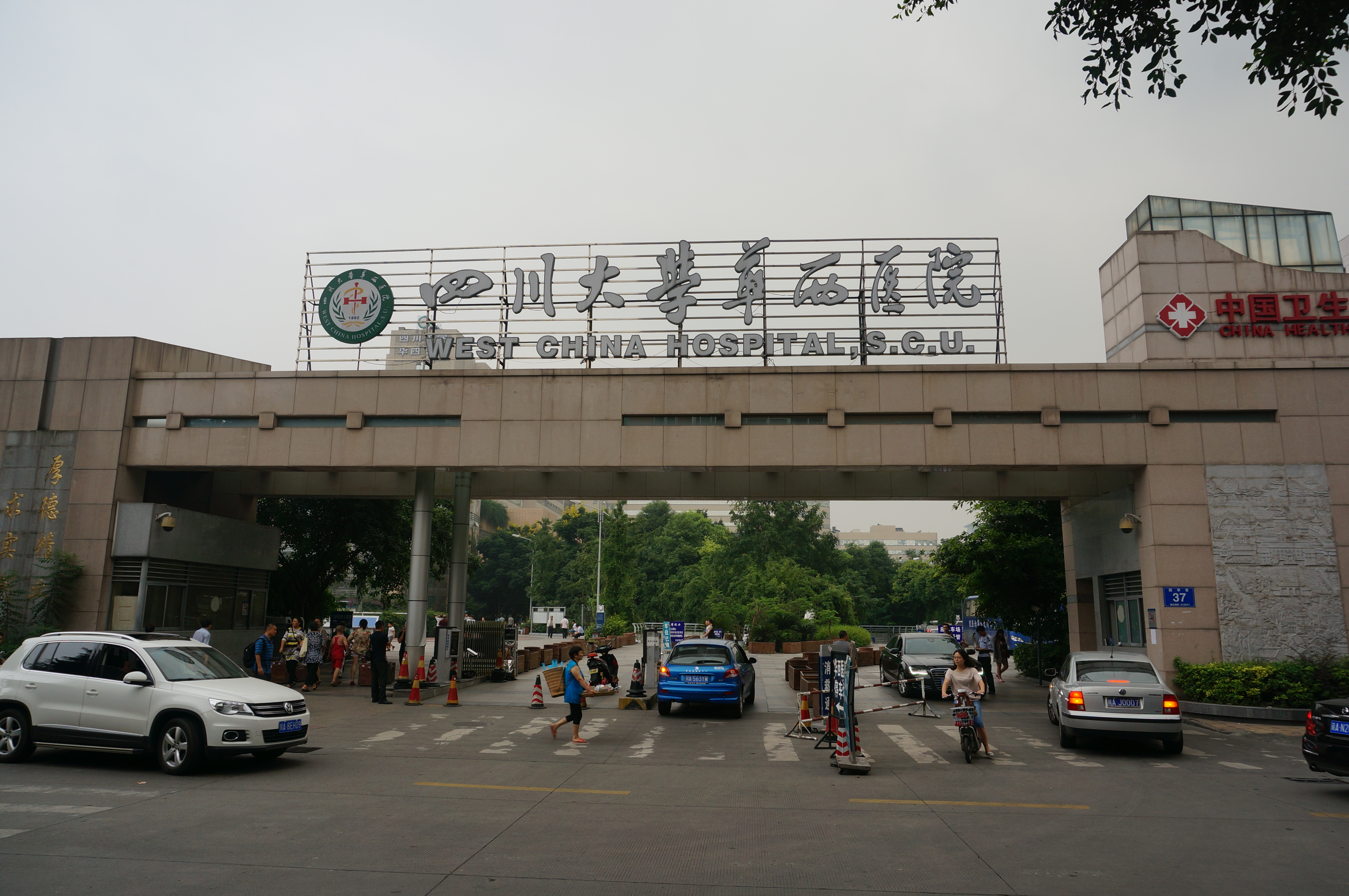
- The hospital's gate in 2014

Geography
- Location: No. 37, Guoxue Alley, Wuhou, Chengdu, Sichuan, China

Organisation
- Care system: Public
- Type: Teaching and research
- Affiliated university: Sichuan University

Services
- Emergency department: Yes
- Beds: 4,900

History
- Founded: 1892; 134 years ago

Links
- Website: wchscu.cn

West China Hospital
- Simplified Chinese: 四川大学华西医院
- Traditional Chinese: 四川大學華西醫院
Transcriptions
Standard Mandarin
- Hanyu Pinyin: Sìchuān Dàxué Huáxī Yīyuàn

The West China Hospital of Sichuan University (operating under the name the West China School of Medicine for medical education) is a major public teaching hospital in Chengdu, Sichuan, China. It is owned and operated by the West China Medical Center of Sichuan University. The hospital was founded in 1892 and has developed into the largest single-site hospital in the world. It is consistently ranked among the two highest-ranked hospitals in Chinese hospital assessments.

The hospital traces its origins to Renji Hospital and Cunren Hospital, established in 1892 by Western Protestant medical missions in Chengdu. The two hospitals became teaching hospitals of the medical faculty of West China Union University after the faculty opened in 1914. A new university hospital building was completed at the present Guoxue Alley site in 1946. After several reorganizations of its parent medical school, the hospital assumed its present institutional form following the merger of the West China University of Medical Sciences into Sichuan University in 2000.

As of 2026, the hospital reported 4,900 beds across three directly affiliated medical campuses, 54 clinical departments, 7.64 million outpatient and emergency visits, 280,000 discharged inpatients and 220,000 surgical procedures during the year. Since its founding in the 20th century, the hospital has long served as a major receiving and referral hospital for disasters and public-health emergencies in Sichuan and nationwide.

== History ==
=== Mission-hospital origins ===
West China Hospital's institutional history begins with the creation of Renji Hospital (仁济医院) and Cunren Hospital (存仁医院) in Chengdu in 1892. The hospitals were established through Christian medical missions from the United States, Britain and Canada. They formed part of a wider growth of missionary medicine and education in Sichuan around the turn of the twentieth century.

West China Union University opened in Chengdu in 1910 as an interdenominational Christian university organized by the American Baptist Foreign Mission Society, the Methodist Episcopal Church in the United States, the Friends' Foreign Mission Association of Britain and Ireland, and the Methodist Church of Canada. Its medical faculty opened in the autumn of 1914 with eight students, and Renji Hospital and Cunren Hospital became its teaching hospitals. The resulting link between clinical practice and university medical education became the basis of the later West China School of Medicine and West China Hospital.

=== Wartime period ===
During the Second Sino-Japanese War, universities displaced from eastern and northern China regions relocated their students and faculty to Chengdu. West China Union University accommodated and cooperated with those universities, including National Central University, Jinling University, Yenching University, and Cheeloo University, and subsequently, a joint university hospital was organized in 1938. A later account in the European Heart Journal described West China Hospital and its predecessor institutions as an important center of medical teaching during the war, when academics from universities in Japanese-occupied or threatened areas moved westward. The displaced universities from eastern and northern China regions returned after the war ended.

In 1946, West China Union University completed a new hospital on Guoxue Alley. Known as the University Hospital or West China Hospital, it established the institution at the site that remains its principal location nowadays.

=== Modern times ===
In 1950, the Communist party took over then private West China Union University and renamed it West China University. In 1953, following the reorganization of higher education mandated by the PRC central government in Beijing, the university was dissolved into many other universities, while its faculty of medicine was preserved and renamed Sichuan Medical College; the hospital was renamed the Affiliated Hospital of Sichuan Medical College accordingly.

Sichuan Medical College was renamed the West China University of Medical Sciences in 1985, with the hospital becoming its first university hospital. In October 2000, the West China University of Medical Sciences merged into Sichuan University. The medical school and hospital subsequently adopted the name West China School of Medicine/West China Hospital of Sichuan University.

In 1987, with approval from the Ministry of Health, West China Hospital's departments of obstetrics and gynecology and pediatrics were separated to form an independent hospital, the West China Second University Hospital (also known as the West China Women's and Children's Hospital).

== Clinical services ==
West China Hospital is a comprehensive teaching hospital treating patients across a broad range of medical and surgical specialties. It functions as a referral center for difficult and critical cases in western China and provides emergency, inpatient, outpatient and specialist services.

As of 2026, the hospital reported 4,900 authorized beds and 54 clinical departments, including seven disease-specific centers, across three directly operated medical campuses. Its associated West China School of Medicine provides undergraduate, postgraduate, residency and continuing medical education. The clinical school offers programs in clinical medicine, nursing and allied health disciplines and is integrated with the hospital's clinical departments.

The hospital also operates services intended for international patients. Its International Medical Center provides outpatient, inpatient, and emergency services with access to specialists from the hospital's clinical departments.

== Campuses ==
West China Hospital operates three principal medical campuses in Chengdu: the Huaxiba campus (华西坝院区), the Jinjiang campus (锦江院区), and the Wenjiang campus (温江院区).

The historic main hospital is in the Huaxiba area of central Chengdu, with its principal address at 37 Guoxue Alley in Wuhou. This is the location at which West China Union University's new university hospital was completed in 1946.

The Jinjiang campus, at 1166 Jinjiang Avenue in Jinjiang, began trial operation on 5 February 2025 and was fully opened on 19 February. Its opening established the hospital's current "one hospital, three campuses" operating structure. The first phase covers approximately 179,000 m^{2} (1,930,000 sq ft) and contains 1,094 beds. It includes centers focused on neurological disease, paediatric medicine, infectious disease, gastric cancer and colorectal cancer, together with outpatient, day-surgery and health-management services. A second phase has been planned to include a national emergency medical rescue base.

== Medical education and research ==
West China Hospital forms an integrated academic medical institution with the West China School of Medicine of Sichuan University. Its teaching lineage derives from the medical faculty founded at West China Union University in 1914. The hospital provides clinical training for medical students as well as postgraduate, residency, fellowship and continuing-medical-education programs.

The hospital is also a major biomedical-research institution. Its research encompasses basic, translational and clinical medicine, supported by university and national-level laboratories and clinical research platforms. Its research performance is one of the factors contributing to its position in Chinese hospital assessments; a 2022 review of hospital-ranking methodologies noted that Chinese systems give substantial weight to measures including scientific publications, research funding, key laboratories and senior academic personnel.

West China Hospital has been important in the development of evidence-based medicine in China. The Chinese Evidence-Based Medicine Center was approved by the national Ministry of Health in 1997, and the Chinese Cochrane Center was established at West China Hospital in 1999. It subsequently became known as the Cochrane China Center and forms part of the international Cochrane network.

The hospital is also associated with the Chinese Clinical Trial Registry (ChiCTR). The World Health Organization lists the Chinese Evidence-Based Medicine Center and Chinese Cochrane Center at West China Hospital as the agency managing the registry; ChiCTR is a primary registry in the WHO International Clinical Trials Registry Platform network.

In 2016, a team led by oncologist Lu You at Sichuan University conducted a clinical study at West China Hospital involving immune cells modified using CRISPR-Cas9 for patients with advanced lung cancer. In July 2016, Nature reported plans for what was expected to become the first clinical trial in which CRISPR-edited cells would be administered to people. In October that year, the researchers administered CRISPR-edited immune cells to a patient with lung cancer. Nature subsequently reported the procedure as the first time cells edited using CRISPR had been introduced into a human patient. The trial became an early landmark in the transition of CRISPR gene-editing technology from laboratory research to human therapeutic studies.

=== Translational medicine national facility ===
In 2013, the Chinese central government entrusted West China Hospital with establishing the National Major Science and Technology Infrastructure for Translational Medicine (Sichuan) (转化医学国家重大科技基础设施（四川）). The facility receives special funding from both the central and provincial governments. Its main building complex was completed and officially opened in September 2021.

The center is one of the five national facilities for translational medicine established by the Chinese central government under the 12th Five-Year Plan, and it prioritizes on the translation of research in biotherapy into clinical applications. The facility comprises four interconnected research platforms for biologic-agent screening, biologic preparation, clinical translational validation, and supporting technologies, distributed among three sites in Chengdu and covering stages from basic and preclinical research to clinical evaluation. The Translational Medicine Complex at West China Hospital serves as its core clinical-research base and contains nearly 200 research beds, as well as facilities for precision-medicine testing, advanced medical imaging, and the development and preparation of cell-therapy products. The broader facility is designed to provide an integrated pathway for moving biomedical discoveries through preclinical assessment and clinical research toward applications including new therapies, drugs, diagnostic products, and medical technologies.

== Emergency response ==
Since its founding in the 20th century, West China Hospital has long served as a major receiving and referral hospital for warfare, natural disasters, and public-health emergencies in Sichuan and nationwide.

During the Second Sino-Japanese War, West China Union University and its affiliated hospitals, predecessors of the present West China Hospital, took part in wartime medical relief. In 1939, medical faculty trained members of the Five Universities Wartime Service Corps in first aid and air-raid protection; following a Japanese air raid on southern Chengdu on 11 June, volunteers treated casualties and transferred seriously wounded patients to the Three Universities Joint Hospital. Students also participated in relief work beyond Chengdu: Duke University historian Nicole Elizabeth Barnes records that most of the approximately 60 Chinese members of the Friends' Ambulance Unit's China Convoy were West China students, serving as part of an international medical-relief effort during the war.

Following the magnitude-8.0 Wenchuan earthquake of 12 May 2008, severely injured patients were transferred to major hospitals in Chengdu, including West China Hospital. It served as one of the principal tertiary centers receiving earthquake casualties and supporting medical rescue operations. The hospital was designated by the provincial government as the treatment center for patients with complex, critical injuries, and as the medical-technical support center for hospitals in disaster areas. It treated a total of 2,779 injured patients, with 1,907 admitted for inpatient care, including 1,153 in critical condition, and performed 1,457 surgeries, achieving a mortality rate of just 1.57%.

In 2018, West China Hospital (operating under the name "Sichuan" as an emergency medical team) was accredited by the World Health Organization as the world's only non-military international emergency medical team to receive the highest-level (Type-3) certification.

In response to the early COVID-19 outbreak in Wuhan in 2020, West China Hospital sent at least five medical teams to Wuhan for emergency medical relief. In February 2020, China Daily reported that one of West China Hospital's dispatched medical teams, consisting of 131 physicians, was staffing an intensive care unit in the eastern section of the Renmin Hospital of Wuhan University.

== Rankings ==
West China Hospital has frequently appeared near the top of national hospital rankings in China. A 2022 review in Health Science Reports compared three prominent Chinese hospital assessments and ranking systems, and found that Peking Union Medical College Hospital, West China Hospital, and the PLA General Hospital occupied the top three positions across all three systems; West China Hospital's average position among the three was 2.00.

In the 2023 Chinese Hospital Science and Technology Evaluation Metrics (STEM), released by the Chinese Academy of Medical Sciences in July 2024, West China Hospital ranked 1st overall among 2,943 tertiary hospitals evaluated. Sichuan Daily reported that this was the hospital's eleventh consecutive first-place result in the annual STEM assessment. Five of its disciplines, including radiology, ultrasound medicine, nursing, anesthesiology, and urology, ranked first in their respective categories.

In the Nature Index 2025 Research Leaders table for healthcare institutions, based on research articles published during 2024 in the journals tracked by the index, the combined West China School of Medicine/West China Hospital institution ranked 12th worldwide. It was the highest-ranked mainland Chinese institution in that particular healthcare table. The Nature Index measures contributions to a selected group of natural-science and health-science journals and is therefore an indicator of research output rather than a ranking of overall clinical quality.

West China Hospital has been ranked:

- A++ (highest rating) in the National Performance Evaluation of Public Tertiary Hospitals by the National Health Commission for 5 consecutive years.
- Top for four consecutive years in science & technology among all Chinese hospitals.
- Top in Number of National Key Clinical Specialties (37) of National Health Commission.

In addition, the hospital has published quite a number of research papers in prestigious journals including Cell (journal), Nature (journal), and Science (journal).

== See also ==
- West China Medical Center of Sichuan University
- Sichuan University
- Protestantism in Sichuan
- List of hospitals in China
