= West China School/Hospital of Stomatology =

Dental school and hospital in Chengdu, Sichuan, China

- West China Medical Center
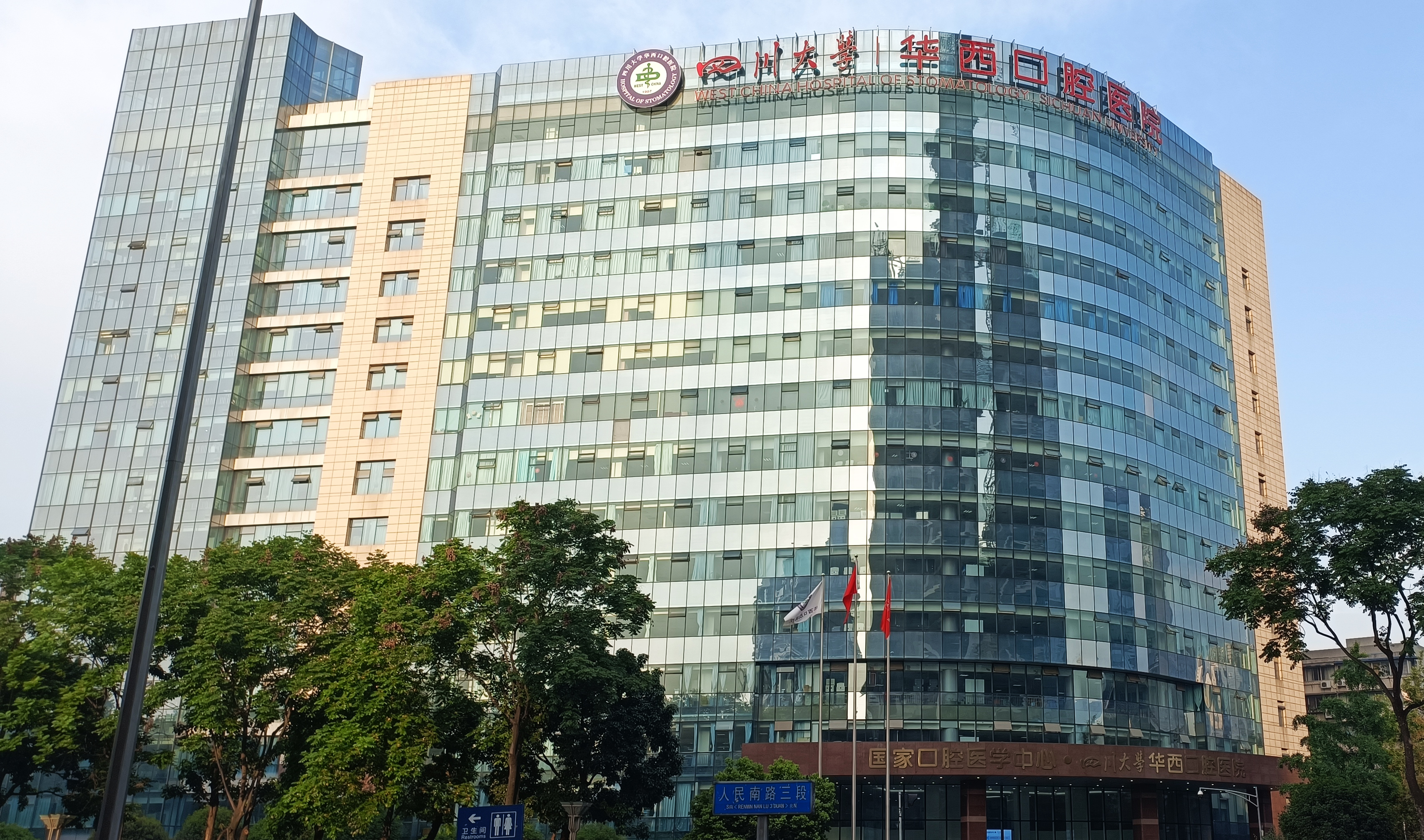
- Hospital in 2022

Geography
- Location: 14 Renmin South Road Third Section, Wuhou, Chengdu, Sichuan, China

Organisation
- Type: Specialist
- Affiliated university: Sichuan University

Services
- Standards: Grade III, Class A
- Emergency department: Yes
- Speciality: Dentistry; oral and maxillofacial surgery

History
- Founded: 1907; 119 years ago

Links
- Website: en.wcss.cn
- Lists: Hospitals in China

The West China School/Hospital of Stomatology (Chinese: 四川大学华西口腔医学院 华西口腔医院) is a public tertiary dental school and hospital in Chengdu, Sichuan, China. Owned and operated by the West China Medical Center of Sichuan University, it specializes in dentistry and oral and maxillofacial medicine.

The institution traces its origins to the Renji Dental Clinic established in Chengdu in 1907 by Canadian dentist Ashley Woodward Lindsay. The clinic was expanded into a dental hospital in 1912, and in 1917, the dental school of West China Union University was established. Modern histories of dental education identify the West China Union University dental program as the earliest institution of higher dental education in China.

The institution is a Grade-III, Class-A specialist hospital and hosts national clinical, research and training programs in oral medicine. In 2020, the National Health Commission entrusted the institution to serve as one of the three National Centers for Stomatology in the country.

== History ==
=== Origins ===
Modern dentistry in Chengdu developed in the early 20th century through the work of Western medical missionaries. Ashley Woodward Lindsay, a graduate of the Royal College of Dental Surgeons of Ontario in Toronto, left Canada for Chengdu in 1907. With assistance from physician and missionary Omar L. Kilborn, Lindsay established a dental clinic on Sishengci Street. A history published through China's National Health Commission describes the clinic as marking the beginning of modern dentistry in Chengdu.

Sichuan University dates the institutional history of the present hospital to the establishment of the Renji Dental Clinic in 1907. It records the expansion of the clinic into the Renji Dental Hospital in 1912. The hospital describes the 1912 institution as China's first specialized dental hospital.

West China Union University, a missionary-founded university established in Chengdu in 1910, subsequently became the principal institutional base for Lindsay's dental work. In 1917, the university established its dental education program. The dental school at West China Union University was the earliest dental education institution in China. Several early faculty members were trained at the University of Toronto Faculty of Dentistry, which credits these dentists with helping introduce a university-based model of dental education to China and with contributing to the development of national dental-education standards.

In the late 1920s the medical and dental programs of West China Union University were brought into a combined academic structure. The university's dental hospital moved to the Huaxiba campus in 1928 and became the Stomatological Hospital of West China Union University. During the 1930s and 1940s, the institution expanded its research and academic activities. A medical and dental research section was established in 1936, followed by a dedicated oral-disease research section in the 1940s.

=== Reorganization after 1949 ===
Following the Communist party took over Chengdu in 1949, the institution underwent several reorganizations and name changes. In 1951, West China Union University was renamed West China University. In 1953, following the nationwide restructuring of higher education, it became the Department of Stomatology and affiliated stomatological hospital of Sichuan Medical College. China's first dedicated oral and maxillofacial surgery ward was also established there in 1953.

A Research Institute of Stomatology was established in 1958. In 1966, a purpose-built stomatological hospital building was completed, while postgraduate education expanded in the following decades. The institution became an authorized master's-degree training site in stomatology in 1978 and a doctoral-degree training site in 1981.

In 1985, Sichuan Medical College was renamed the West China University of Medical Sciences, and the dental institution became its College of Stomatology and affiliated stomatological hospital. The hospital was recognized as a Grade-III, Class-A stomatological specialist hospital in 1997.

=== 21st century ===
The West China University of Medical Sciences merged with Sichuan University in 2000. The dental school and hospital adopted their current Sichuan University names in 2001, becoming the West China School of Stomatology and the West China Hospital of Stomatology.

A new clinical building was completed in 2009, followed by a dedicated research building in 2010. During the 2000s and 2010s, the institution also expanded its national research infrastructure, including laboratories in oral diseases, regenerative medicine and clinical research.

In 2020, the National Health Commission entrusted the institution to serve as one of the three National Centers for Stomatology (国家口腔医学中心) in the country. The stomatology national-center system was designed to concentrate expertise in the diagnosis and treatment of complex oral diseases, professional training, clinical research, standards development, and quality control.

== Clinical services ==
The institution is a specialist hospital covering the major fields of dentistry and oral and maxillofacial medicine. Its clinical departments include cariology and endodontics, periodontics, oral medicine, prosthodontics, implant dentistry, orthodontics, pediatric dentistry, preventive dentistry and general dentistry, as well as several oral and maxillofacial surgical services. Its surgical services include head and neck oncology, trauma and reconstructive surgery, orthognathic and temporomandibular-joint surgery, and cleft lip and palate surgery. Supporting departments include oral pathology, radiology, anesthesia, pharmacy, clinical laboratory services and dental technology.

The hospital identifies eight areas as national key clinical specialties: cariology and endodontics, periodontics, oral and maxillofacial surgery, prosthodontics, orthodontics, oral implantology, pediatric dentistry and oral mucosal disease. It also serves as a national standardized residency-training base and is involved in the national qualification examination and examiner training system for stomatology. The hospital records more than one million outpatient and emergency visits annually. Its emergency dentistry department provides 24-hour treatment for conditions including acute dental pain, oral infection, bleeding and dental or maxillofacial trauma.

== Dental education ==
The institution operates its medical education under the name the West China School of Stomatology. This arrangement combines undergraduate and postgraduate dental education with patient care and research. The school offers undergraduate programs including a four-year dental-technology program, a five-year dental medicine program and an eight-year clinical medicine and dentistry track. It also provides master's and doctoral education and clinical training for international students. The academic structure encompasses basic oral sciences, operative dentistry and oral medicine, oral and maxillofacial surgery, prosthodontics, orthodontics and interdisciplinary oral sciences. The institution also operates national-level experimental and virtual-simulation teaching platforms.

West China's historical influence on Chinese dental education has been widely noted. A study of dental education before 1949 described the 1917-established dental school at West China Union University as China's earliest institution dedicated to educating dentists. University of Toronto historical collections similarly identify the West China program as an important channel through which modern dental teaching methods were introduced into China.

The institution operates two museums: the West China Museum of Stomatology (华西口腔医学博物馆) and the West China Museum of Stomatological Health Education (华西口腔健康教育博物馆). The stomatology museum was established in 1932 as the Dental Medicine Hall of the Museum of West China Union University (华西协合大学博物馆医牙馆). The museum currently includes material on the early missionary dentists in Chengdu, historical dental equipment, teaching materials and records of the development of the West China dental school. The stomatological health education museum opened in September 2015 as a public science education center dedicated to oral medicine and health, and was designated a National Science Popularization Education Base.

== Dental research ==
Research in oral medicine at the institution can be traced to the medical and dental research section established at West China Union University in 1936. It subsequently developed into an oral-disease research section, the Research Institute of Stomatology in 1958, and a central stomatology laboratory in 1983.

In 2007, the Ministry of Science and Technology of China approved the establishment of the State Key Laboratory of Oral Diseases (口腔疾病研究国家重点实验室) at the institution; the laboratory was renamed the State Key Laboratory of Oral Disease Prevention and Control (口腔疾病防治全国重点实验室) in 2023. Other research infrastructure associated with the school and hospital has included the National Clinical Research Center for Oral Diseases (口腔疾病国家临床医学研究中心), an engineering laboratory for oral regenerative medicine, an international cooperative research center, and clinical-trial facilities.

The institution is also associated with several academic journals. The International Journal of Oral Science is co-sponsored by the West China School of Stomatology and the State Key Laboratory of Oral Diseases, with its editorial office based at the school. The school also established the journal Bone Research, which is published in partnership with Springer Nature.

== Rankings ==
The 2026 SCImago Institutions Rankings health-sector ranking for dentistry placed the West China Hospital of Stomatology first in China and third worldwide. In the 2025 ShanghaiRanking Global Ranking of Academic Subjects, Sichuan University was ranked fifth in the world in Dentistry & Oral Sciences. In the 2026 QS World University Rankings by Subject, Sichuan University was ranked 10th in the world for dentistry.

== See also ==
- West China Medical Center
- Sichuan University
