= West China Union University =

Private university in Chengdu, Sichuan, China

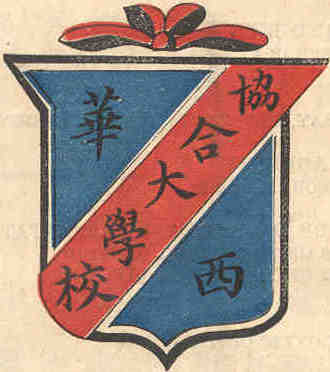
- Coat of arms
- Type: Christian university private university
- Active: 1910 (115 years ago)–1950 (75 years ago)
- Religious affiliation: Protestantism: Anglicanism; Baptistism; Methodism; Quakerism
- Location: Chengdu, Sichuan, Republican China

The West China Union University (Chinese: 華西協合大學), alternatively known as West China University or Huaxi University, was a private Christian university in Chengdu, Sichuan, western China. It was the product of the collective efforts of four Protestant, denominational, missionary boards — American Baptist Foreign Mission Society (American Baptist Churches USA), American Methodist Episcopal Mission (Methodist Episcopal Church), Friends' Foreign Mission Association (British Quakers) and Canadian Methodist Mission (Methodist Church of Canada)— and eventually became a division of the West China Educational Union, which was created in 1906. The Church Missionary Society (Church of England) became a partner in the university in 1918.

Once established, the university approached the difficult tasks of educating and converting the people of Sichuan province—an area in size equal to the United Kingdom, France, and Germany combined—as it was the only institution with a Christian purpose in the region. The faculty and administration were attempting to educate and influence the beliefs of a population in excess of 150 million people. The university grew rapidly in its first decade and remained a key player in tertiary education in Sichuan throughout the Republican Era.

== History ==
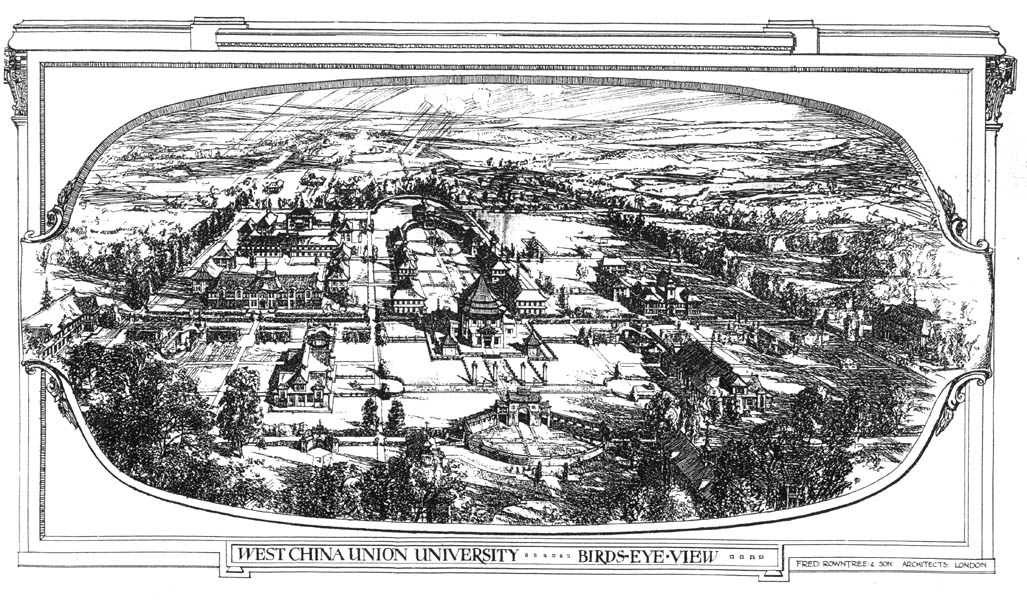
Bird's-eye view of West China Union University, designed by Fred Rowntree.

The university was founded in 1910 next to the city of Chengdu and is still present to this day. The creation of the school manifested from William Reginald Morse's realization that missions in West China were unable to provide educational opportunities. The university was established through the joint efforts of missionary organizations from the United States, Britain and Canada. The mission of the school was "the advancement of the Kingdom of God by means of higher education in West China under Christian auspices". Dr. Joseph Beech, Dr. O. L. Kilborn, Dr. R. G. Kilborn, and Dr. William Reginald Morse played key roles in its formation.

The Ackerman Building, the first permanent building on campus, was opened in 1914. There was only one medical building that measured 30 by 15 feet. There were five staff members in 1914: Drs. C.W. Service, H.W. Irwin, H.L Canright, W.R. Morse, and O.L. Kilborne. As Morse noted, "The University suffered from poverty, lack of equipment, deficiency in staff, and inadequate teaching rooms". However, in 1924, the WCUU opened enrollment to women and became the first co-educational university inland.

West China Union University was home to Dr. John W. Yost and then Reverend Raymond R. Brewer. The West China Educational Union tied in the old West China Mission where Reverend Frank D. Gamewell was once superintendent. The college taught all subjects and had strong international ties, including with the US, England, Canada. WCUU graduates became part of a leading class in China consisting of well-trained professionals, intellectuals, and educators. Although the university was shut down in 1926 and the WCEU was closed shortly thereafter when all foreigners were ordered to leave China, the Chinese scholars who remained there carried on, taught others, and made progress on their own. Therefore, WCUU had lasting effects on education in China.

During World War II, John Leighton Stuart helped students and faculty members of Yenching University transfer from Beijing (Peking) to Chengdu, where WCUU sheltered those exile intellectuals.

After World War II:

- In 1950, the West China Union University was renamed as West China University.
- In 1950, the Agriculture and Fine Arts Department of West China University amalgamated and transformed as Southwestern Institute of Agriculture, then developed into Southwestern University of Agriculture (now merged by Southwest University, relocated to Chongqing (Chungking).

In 1952, West China University separated departments into Szechuan Normal College, then developed into the Sichuan Normal University and the China West Normal University.

In 1952, the Chemical Industry and Light Manufacturing School of West China University became independent as Szechuan Institute of Chemical Industry (developed into The Chengdu Engineering College and The Chengdu University of Science and Technology, then merged into Sichuan University).

In 1952, the Economics Department of West China University amalgamated and transformed as the Szechuan Institute of Finance and Economics (renamed to Southwestern University of Finance and Economics in 1985).

In 1952, the Arts & Science Department of West China University was acquired by Sichuan University.

In 1953, West China University with other education partners merged into the Sichuan Medical College.

In 1985, the Sichuan Medical College was renamed as the West China University of Medical Sciences.

As of June 2000, the university had eight schools: School of Basic Medicine, School of Stomatology, School of Medicine, School of Nursing, School of Public Health, School of Pharmacy, School of Continuing Education, and School of Forensic Medicine.

In September 2000, West China University of Medical Sciences merged into the Sichuan University, and then it was renamed "West China Center of Medical Sciences, Sichuan University".

== Presidents ==
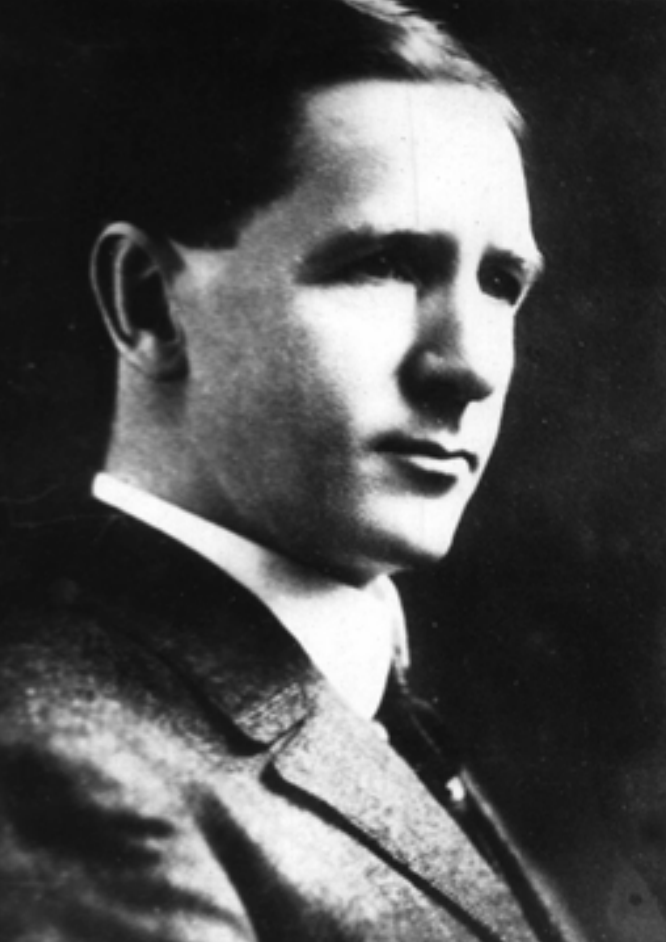
Joseph Beech, founding president of the Union University

- 1913–1930: Joseph Beech
- 1930–1932: Lincoln L. G. Dsang
- 1932–1933: S. H. Fong
- 1933–1946: Lincoln L. G. Dsang
- 1946–1951: S. H. Fong

Vice presidents

- Harry Thomas Silcock
- Robert Louis Simkin

After 1950

- 1951–1953: Liu Chengzhao, as president of Huaxi University

== Gallery ==
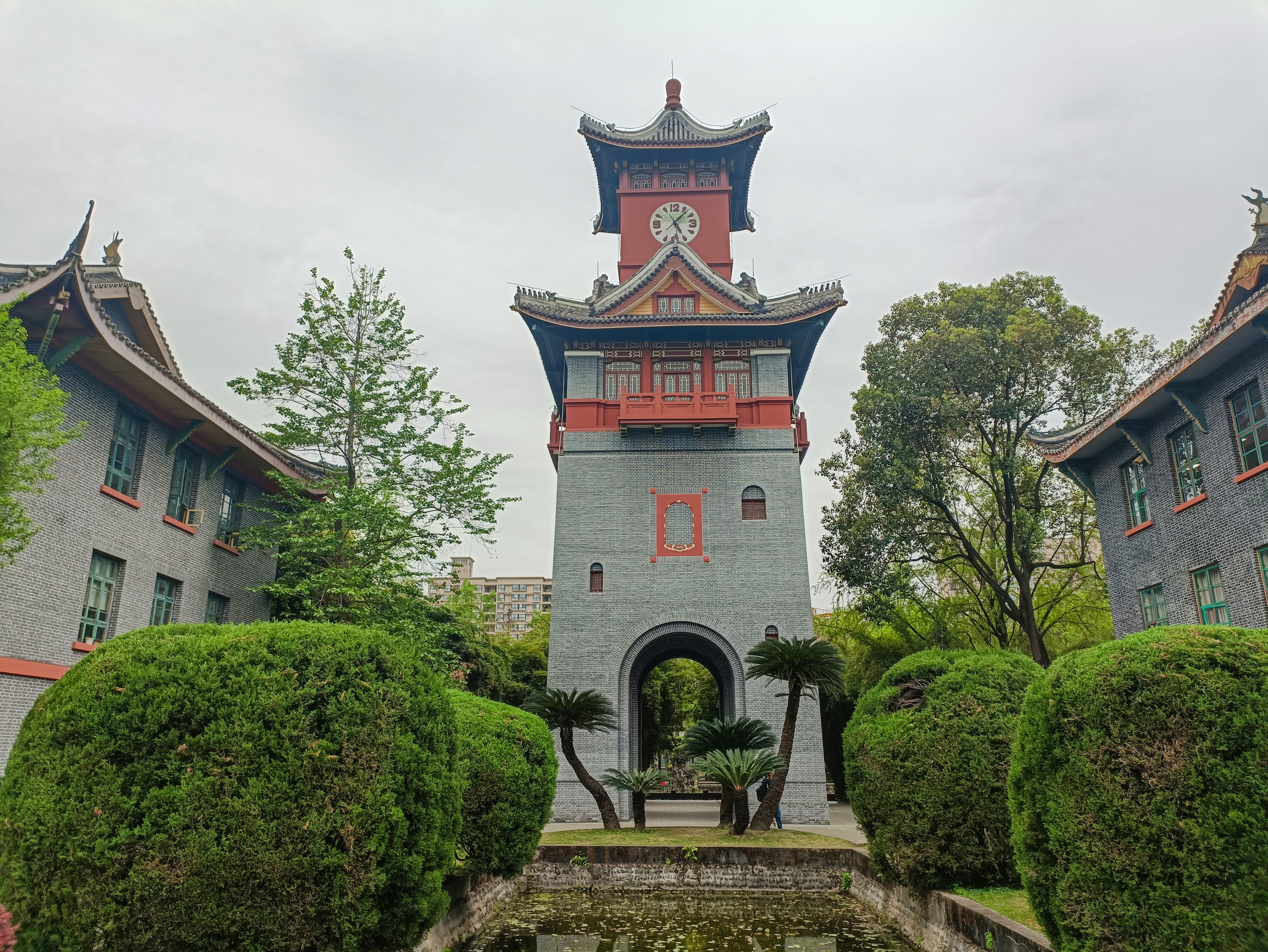
Coles Memorial Clock Tower, now part of the West China Medical Center

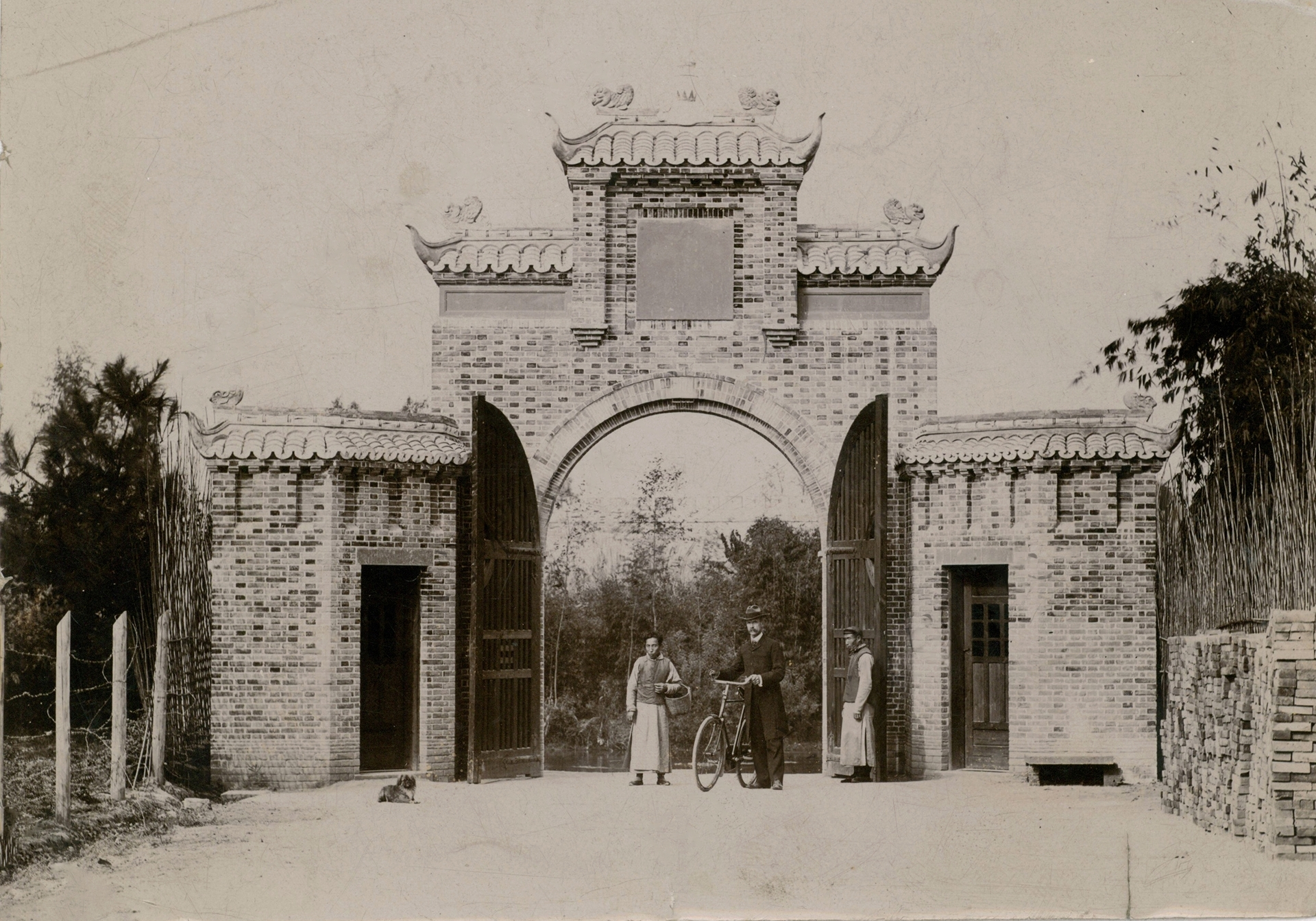
Newly completed gate of the Union University, 1915

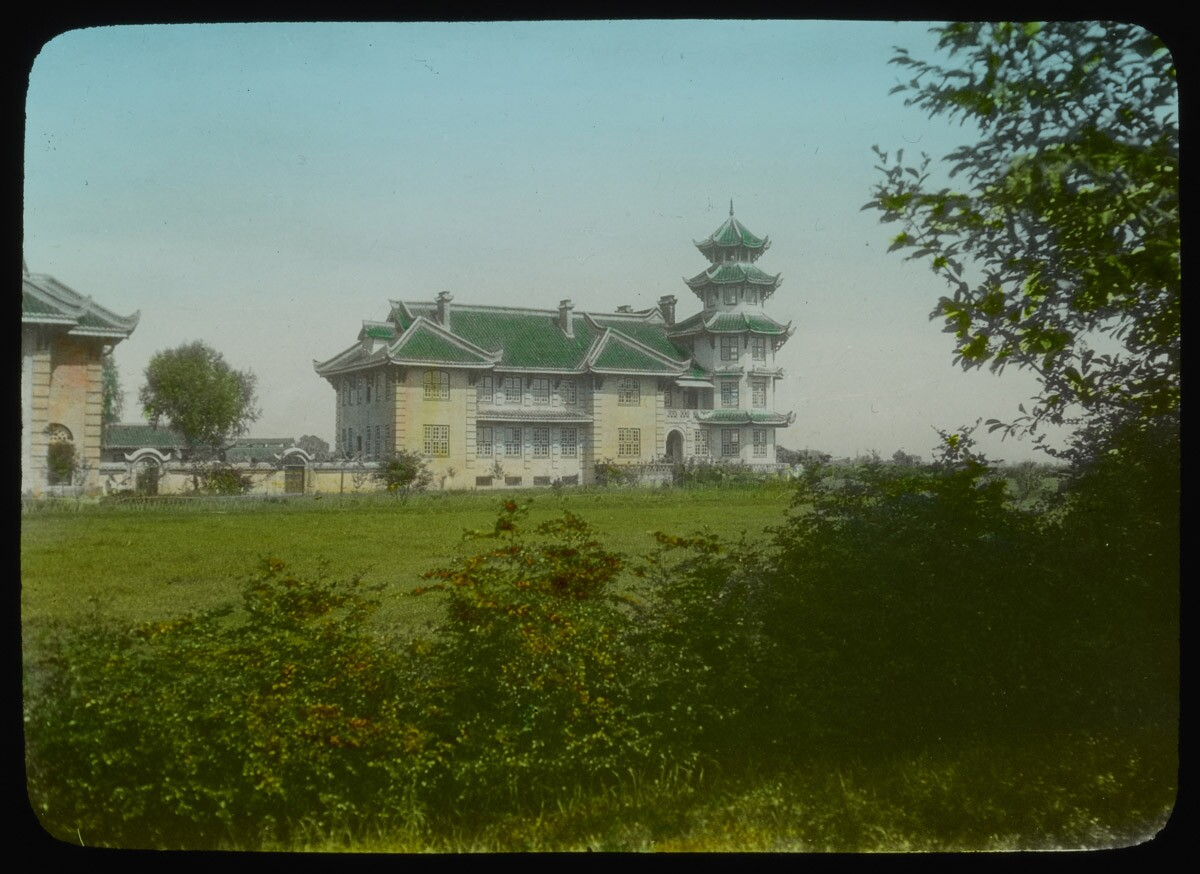
Ackerman Building, the first building constructed at the Union University, photo by Sidney D. Gamble, 1917

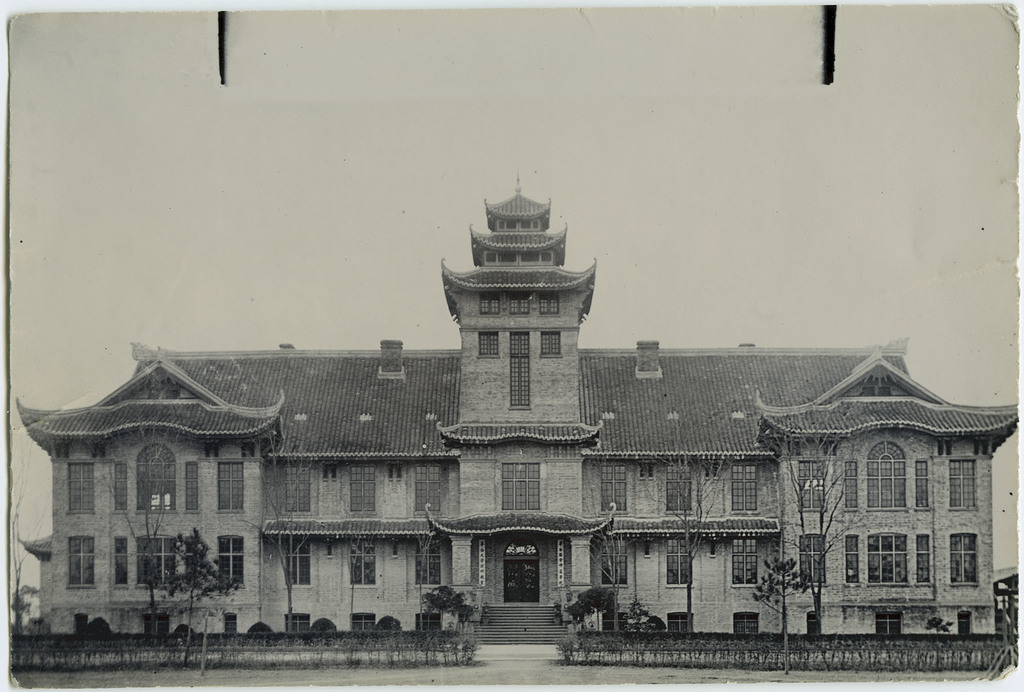
Hart Memorial College (Canadian Methodist Mission)

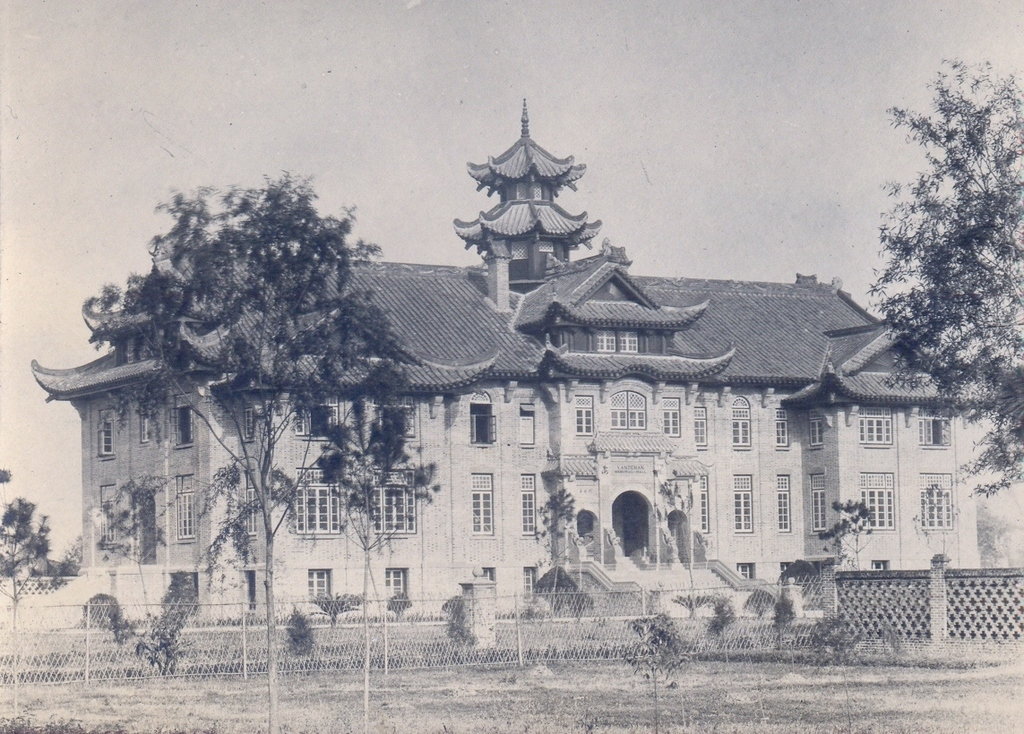
Van Dernan Hall (American Baptist Foreign Mission Society)

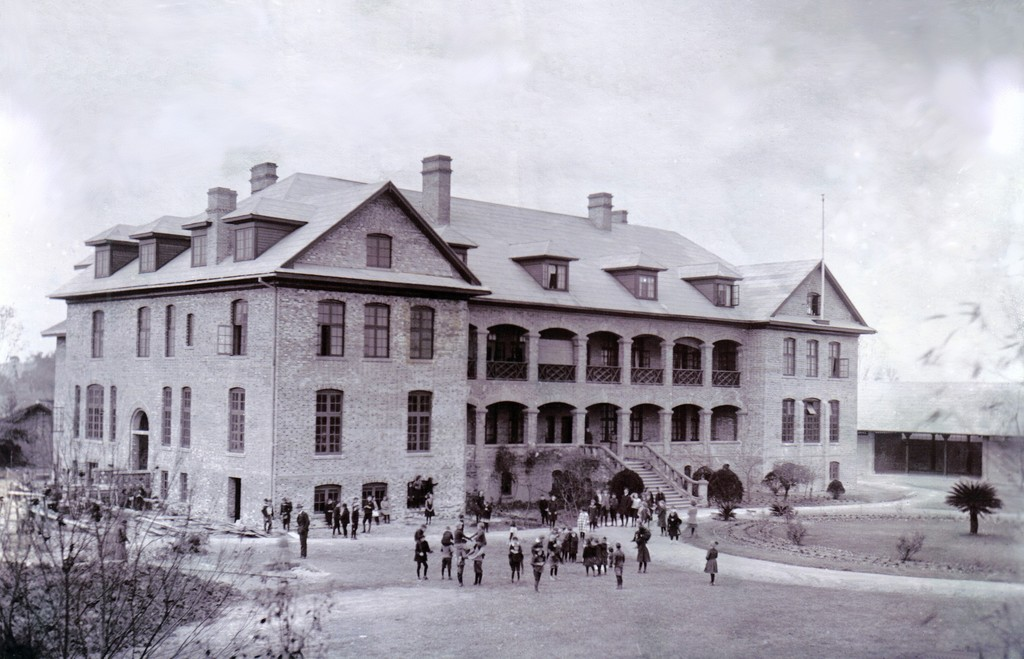
Canadian School with landscaped grounds

== See also ==
- Protestantism in Sichuan
  - Anglicanism in Sichuan
  - Methodism in Sichuan
  - Quakerism in Sichuan
  - Baptist Christianity in Sichuan
- West China College of Stomatology
- The West China Missionary News
- Journal of the West China Border Research Society
