= Sichuan University =

National public university in Chengdu, Sichuan, China

Coordinates: 30.63301°N 104.08772°E

- 四川大学
- Motto: 海纳百川 有容乃大
- Motto in English: Sea, all water, receives all rivers; Utmost wit listens to all sides
- Type: Public
- Established: 1896; 130 years ago
- Affiliations: BRICS Universities League, Double First-Class Construction, 211 Project, 985 Project
- President: Wang Jingsong (汪劲松)
- Academic staff: 6,789
- Students: 70,000+
- Undergraduates: 37,000+
- Postgraduates: 31,000+
- Location: Chengdu, Sichuan, China
- Colors
- Website: scu.edu.cn en.scu.edu.cn

Chinese name
- Simplified Chinese: 四川大学
- Traditional Chinese: 四川大學
Transcriptions
Standard Mandarin
- Hanyu Pinyin: Sìchuān Dàxué

Sichuan University (SCU) is a public university in Chengdu, Sichuan, China. The university is affiliated with and funded by the Ministry of Education. The university is part of Project 211, Project 985, and the Double First-Class Construction.

In 1994, the then Chengdu University of Science and Technology and then Sichuan University merged to form Sichuan Union University (which was renamed Sichuan University in 1998). In 2000, the then West China University of Medical Sciences and then Sichuan University merged to establish the current form of Sichuan University.

Old gate of the National Sichuan University

== History ==
Sichuan University is one of the earliest institutions of higher education in China. The present-day Sichuan University developed from three principal institutional origins: the university that became National Sichuan University (国立四川大学) in 1931, the engineering and applied sciences institution that later became the Chengdu University of Science and Technology, and the medical sciences institution descended from West China Union University. The International Association of Universities dates Sichuan University's foundation to 1896, with the present institution being the product of major mergers in 1994 and 2000.

=== Origins and the late Qing period ===
Sichuan University traces its direct modern institutional origin to the Sichuan Chinese and Western School (四川中西学堂). In 1895, Lu Chuanlin (鹿传霖), then governor of Sichuan, petitioned the Guangxu Emperor for permission to establish a modern school in Chengdu combining Chinese and Western learning. The school formally opened on 18 June 1896. Its initial curriculum included English and French, with mathematics added the following year; its organization reflected the emerging modern educational system, with instruction divided by subject and student progress assessed through a credit-like system.

The school was subsequently combined with older academies in Chengdu. In 1902, it merged with Zunjing Academy (尊经书院), an academy established in the late Qing period, to form the Sichuan Provincial University Hall (四川通省大学堂). By the end of that year the institution had been renamed the Sichuan Provincial Capital Higher School (四川省城高等学堂). In 1903, Jinjiang Academy (锦江书院), whose history dated to the Qing dynasty, was incorporated into it. These older academies are therefore part of the university's institutional ancestry, although the university and the World Higher Education Database use 1896 as the beginning of its modern history.

=== Republican era and National Sichuan University ===
Following the 1911 Revolution and the establishment of the Republic of China, the Sichuan Provincial Higher School was renamed the Sichuan Government Higher School. A further reorganization took place in 1916, when its faculty, students and property were incorporated into Sichuan Higher Normal School, which became the National Chengdu Higher Normal School (国立成都高等师范学校).

Changes to China's higher-education system during the 1920s led to the division of the higher normal school. National Chengdu University (国立成都大学) was established in 1926 from part of the former institution, initially with programs in the humanities, sciences and law, while its teacher-training functions developed into National Chengdu Normal University (国立成都师范大学). Meanwhile, in 1927, five provincially administered specialized institutions in Chinese studies, foreign languages, law and politics, agriculture, and engineering were consolidated into Public Sichuan University (公立四川大学). The latter was organized into colleges covering Chinese literature, foreign literature, law and politics, engineering and agriculture.

On 9 November 1931, National Chengdu University, National Chengdu Normal University, and Public Sichuan University were consolidated as National Sichuan University (国立四川大学). The consolidation brought the principal streams of state-run higher education in Chengdu into a single comprehensive university. During the following years it developed colleges in the humanities, sciences, law, engineering, agriculture, and teacher education.

The Second Sino-Japanese War substantially disrupted the university. As Chengdu became a target of Japanese air raids, the university's campus was bombed on 27 July 1939, damaging or destroying numerous buildings. To reduce the danger to students and staff, National Sichuan University relocated to Mount Emei in 1939, where it continued teaching during the war. It returned to Chengdu in 1943 and moved to the area that became its present Wangjiang Campus. By 1949, National Sichuan University comprised six colleges and 25 academic departments.

=== West China Union University and medical sciences ===
A separate institutional origin, which would become part of Sichuan University in 2000, began with West China Union University (WCUU). It was founded in Chengdu by Protestant missionary organizations from Britain, Canada, and the United States, and opened in 1910 with 11 students. Operations were interrupted during the 1911 Revolution, but the university's arts and sciences program reopened in 1913. A medical faculty began instruction in 1914. The university subsequently developed medical and dental education into major components of its academic work.

After the establishment of the People's Republic of China and the Communist party's takeover of Chengdu in 1949, the people's government assumed administration of the private West China Union University, which was renamed West China University in 1951. During the nationwide reorganization of higher education mandated by the central government in Beijing in the early 1950s, its non-medical departments were redistributed to other institutions of higher education, while its medical and health-sciences programs formed the basis of Sichuan Medical College (四川医学院) in 1953. Sichuan Medical College received university status and was renamed the West China University of Medical Sciences (华西医科大学) in 1985.

=== Reorganization after 1949 and the engineering wing ===
National Sichuan University was formally renamed Sichuan University in September 1950. Soon afterward it was extensively reorganized as part of a nationwide restructuring of Chinese higher education. The reforms of the 1950s, influenced by the Soviet model of specialized higher-education institutions, separated many professional faculties from comprehensive universities, and redistributed departments among institutions. Sichuan University accordingly changed from a broad pre-1949 comprehensive university into an institution concentrated largely in the humanities and basic sciences.

One important consequence of this restructuring was the development of a separate engineering lineage. In August 1954, the former College of Engineering of Sichuan University became the independent Chengdu Engineering College (成都工学院), initially encompassing fields including mechanical, electrical, civil and hydraulic engineering. In 1955, it absorbed the Sichuan Chemical Engineering College, which had itself been assembled during the earlier departmental adjustments from engineering and chemical-engineering resources in southwestern China. Chengdu Engineering College was renamed the Chengdu University of Science and Technology (CUST; 成都科学技术大学) in 1978 and was designated a national key university.

Sichuan University itself was included among China's national key universities in 1960. Higher education was severely disrupted during the Cultural Revolution; the university archives record that regular student admissions ceased for much of the period from 1967 to 1976. Academic activity and degree education expanded again after the beginning of the reform era in 1978.

By the end of the 1980s, the three principal predecessors of the modern university, which were Sichuan University, the Chengdu University of Science and Technology, and West China University of Medical Sciences, had developed as major neighboring institutions with complementary strengths in the humanities and sciences, engineering, and medicine, respectively. Their later consolidation occurred during another period of nationwide restructuring in Chinese higher education, this time favoring the creation of larger multidisciplinary universities.

=== Mergers and the modern university ===
In April 1994, Sichuan University and the Chengdu University of Science and Technology were merged to form Sichuan Union University (四川联合大学). The merger was among the prominent early examples of the consolidation of Chinese higher-education institutions during the 1990s. Studies of the reform have noted that mergers of large institutions could involve substantial challenges in administrative integration, institutional identity, and academic organization; the Sichuan University–CUST combination became an important case in this broader restructuring process.

Sichuan Union University was selected for the first phase of Project 211 in 1996. In December 1998, the Ministry of Education approved restoration of the name Sichuan University.

The final major merger took place in September 2000. With the approval of the State Council, the Ministry of Education approved Sichuan University and the West China University of Medical Sciences to merge into a new Sichuan University, formally ending the two predecessor institutions as separate legal entities. The former medical university became the basis of Sichuan University's West China Medical Center, preserving the medical and dental traditions of West China Union University within the enlarged institution.

The two mergers brought together the principal academic traditions of the three predecessor universities: the humanities and sciences emphases of Sichuan University, the engineering and applied sciences emphases of the Chengdu University of Science and Technology, and the health sciences of the West China University of Medical Sciences, which formed the present multidisciplinary university.

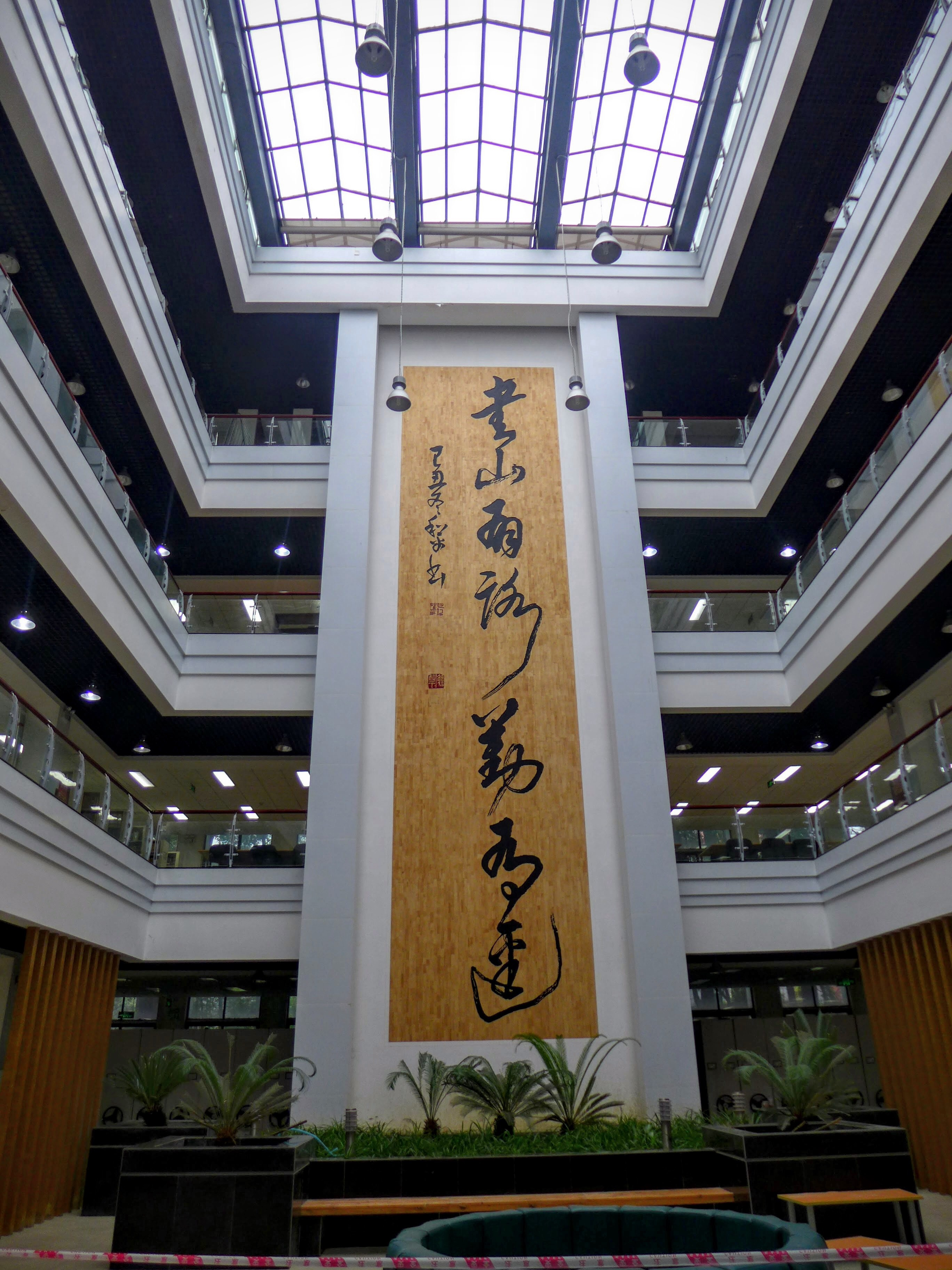
Central atrium of the engineering library on the Wangjiang campus, July 2013

== Academics and research ==
=== Academics ===
Sichuan University is a comprehensive research university directly administered by the Ministry of Education of the People's Republic of China. Its academic programs span 13 broad disciplinary categories: literature, science, engineering, medicine, economics, management, law, history, philosophy, agriculture, education, the arts, and interdisciplinary studies. The university reported 37 discipline-based schools and departments, in addition to the Overseas Education College, in 2026.

Sichuan University has been included in China's national programs for developing research universities, including Project 211, Project 985, and the Double First-Class Construction. In the first Double First-Class discipline list published by the Ministry of Education, six Sichuan University disciplines were selected: mathematics, chemistry, materials science and engineering, basic medicine, stomatology, and nursing. The same six disciplines formed the university's core disciplines during the second Double First-Class construction cycle.

Undergraduate education combines disciplinary training with general education and interdisciplinary programs. The Ministry of Education reported in 2021 that Sichuan University had 64 nationally recognized first-class undergraduate courses at that time and had introduced inquiry-based, small-class teaching across much of its undergraduate curriculum. Its national programs for foundational disciplines have included training bases in mathematics, chemistry, biology, basic medicine, and Chinese language and literature. In 2025, the Ministry of Education described the university as expanding doctoral and interdisciplinary training in areas including artificial intelligence, medical technology, carbon-neutral technologies, new energy, and new materials.

Medical education is organized through the West China Medical Center, whose modern institutional lineage derives from West China Union University. Its principal teaching units include the West China School of Basic Medical Sciences and Forensic Medicine, West China School of Clinical Medicine, West China School of Stomatology, West China School of Public Health, and West China School of Pharmacy. Clinical training and medical research are closely connected with the university's West China hospitals, including West China Hospital, West China Second University Hospital, West China Hospital of Stomatology, and West China Fourth Hospital.

=== Research ===
Sichuan University conducts research across the natural sciences, engineering, medicine, and the humanities and social sciences. In 2026, the university reported one national major science and technology infrastructure facility, 19 other national-level research platforms—including national laboratories, engineering research centers, clinical research centers, and engineering laboratories—four newly organized national research platforms, and four national research platforms in the social sciences.

National laboratories associated with the university include the National Key Laboratory of Biotherapy (生物治疗全国重点实验室), the National Key Laboratory of Oral Disease Prevention and Control (口腔疾病防治全国重点实验室), and the National Key Laboratory of Mountain River Protection and Governance (山区河流保护与治理全国重点实验室). The oral-disease laboratory originated as the State Key Laboratory of Oral Diseases, approved in 2007, and was reorganized under its present name in 2023.

Biomedical and clinical research form a substantial part of the university's research output. The West China medical institutions operate national clinical and translational research platforms in areas including oral disease, biotherapy, and clinical medicine. Engineering and physical-science research is concentrated particularly in materials, polymers, chemistry, chemical engineering, water resources, biomedical engineering, electronics, and energy technologies.

One of its research facilities is the National Major Science and Technology Infrastructure for Translational Medicine (Sichuan), a multi-site facility centered on biotherapeutic translational medicine. The project includes research infrastructure at the Huaxi Campus of West China Hospital, and associated research facilities elsewhere in Chengdu. Its clinical-research core at West China Hospital entered use in 2021, followed by the university's biotherapy translational-medicine building.

Sichuan University's Carbon Resource Neutrality integrated research platform conducts research on the conversion of waste carbon products into green materials and fuels.

The Nature Index, which tracks articles in a selected group of applied, health, natural, and social-science journals, ranked Sichuan University 12th worldwide and 11th in China by research-output share for the rolling period from 1 April 2025 to 31 March 2026. Chemistry and health sciences accounted for substantial portions of its output in the index.

=== Rankings ===
University rankings
BCUR National	Domestic	15
Wu Shulian National	Domestic	9
CUAA National	Alumni	18
QS National	General	17
THE National	General	14–19
QS Asia (Asia version)	General	94
THE Asia (Asia version)	General	=35
ARWU World	Research	77
QS World	General	=324
THE World	General	201–250
USNWR World	General	139

Sichuan University is one of the members of Project 985 (Top Type) and it is one of only two universities in Western China region (alongside Xi'an Jiaotong University) ranking among the top-15 comprehensive research universities nationwide. It is consistently ranked No.1 in Southwestern China, which comprises Chongqing Municipality, Sichuan Province, Guizhou Province, Yunnan Province, and Tibet Autonomous Region with a combination of more than 180 million population.

Internationally, Sichuan University is regarded as one of the most reputable Chinese universities by the Times Higher Education World Reputation Rankings where, it ranked No.61 globally as of 2022.

As of 2026, Sichuan University was ranked No.77 globally (15th in Asia & 10th in China) by Academic Ranking of World Universities and No.139 globally by U.S. News & World Report Best Global Universities Ranking.

The 2025 CWTS Leiden Ranking ranked SCU 4th in the world by total publications and #9 in the world based on the number of their scientific publications belonging to the top 1% in their fields for the time period 2020–2023. Regarding scientific research output, the Nature Index 2026 ranked Sichuan University the No. 8 university in the China & the Asia-Pacific region, and 9th in the world among the global universities.

== Campuses ==
Sichuan University operates four campuses: Wangjiang, Huaxi, Jiang'an, and Meishan. The first three are in Chengdu, while Meishan Campus is in the neighboring city of Meishan. The university reports a combined campus area of 8,050 mu, approximately 5.37 km^{2} (1,330 acres).

=== Wangjiang Campus ===
Wangjiang Campus (望江校区) is the university's principal administrative campus in Wuhou, Chengdu. Its development as the main campus of National Sichuan University began during the Republican period. The university relocated there during the 1940s, and the site subsequently expanded as the principal campus of Sichuan University.

Wangjiang accommodates a large proportion of the university's humanities, social-science, natural-science, and engineering teaching and research. Major facilities include the Liberal Arts and Sciences Library and the Engineering Library, as well as laboratories, engineering research buildings, administrative offices, sports facilities, and student residences.

Several early university buildings have heritage protection. In 2013, the State Council of China included Sichuan University's early buildings dating from 1913 to 1954 in the seventh group of Major Historical and Cultural Sites Protected at the National Level. The designation covers historic buildings at Huaxi and the former administrative building at Wangjiang.

=== Huaxi Campus ===
Huaxi Campus (华西校区), historically known as Huaxiba, is the principal campus of the West China Medical Center in Wuhou, Chengdu. It originated as the campus of West China Union University and retains a concentration of early 20th-century university buildings. The historic structures of Huaxiba form part of the nationally protected group of Sichuan University early buildings.

The campus contains the West China schools of basic medical sciences and forensic medicine, pharmacy, and other medical teaching and research facilities, while the West China clinical, stomatological, and public-health institutions occupy the Huaxi area and adjacent hospital sites. The Medical Library is located on the campus and has particularly strong holdings in medicine and stomatology.

Huaxi's medical complex is closely associated with the university's four principal West China teaching hospitals: West China Hospital, West China Second University Hospital, West China Hospital of Stomatology, and West China Fourth Hospital. Together with the schools and laboratories of the West China Medical Center, they provide facilities for clinical teaching, biomedical research, and specialist medical care.

=== Jiang'an Campus ===
Jiang'an Campus (江安校区) is in Shuangliu, Chengdu. Construction began in the early 2000s, and the campus entered use in September 2003. It was planned around landscaped waterways and open spaces and was developed as an important base for undergraduate and general education.

Facilities include the Jiang'an Library, laboratory buildings, teaching complexes, residence halls, a gymnasium, athletic grounds, and a landscaped waterway extending for nearly one kilometre through the campus. The Jiang'an Library, completed in 2005, has a floor area of approximately 25,300 m^{2} (272,000 sq ft) and was designed as a comprehensive library serving general and foundational study as well as research in the humanities and social sciences.

Several schools use Jiang'an for teaching, administration, or research, including units in the humanities and arts as well as interdisciplinary and engineering programs. The Institute for Disaster Management and Reconstruction, established in cooperation with Hong Kong Polytechnic University, is also based at Jiang'an.

=== Meishan Campus ===
Meishan Campus (眉山校区) is Sichuan University's fourth campus and the first outside Chengdu. It is located at the Dongpo district in the city of Meishan. The Ministry of Education approved its establishment in December 2020, Sichuan University and the Meishan municipal government signed a construction agreement in January 2021, and construction of the first phase began in 2023. The first students and staff moved to the campus in September 2025.

The first phase has a floor area of approximately 340,000 m^{2} (3,700,000 sq ft) and comprises more than 20 buildings. Facilities include Dongpo Academy, a library, a gymnasium, teaching buildings, and research buildings for areas including smart water engineering, smart energy, and new materials. The campus is intended particularly for advanced research, interdisciplinary education, technology transfer, continuing education, and collaboration between the university and local government.

=== Library and museum ===
The Sichuan University Library system developed through the consolidation of the libraries of the former Sichuan University, the Chengdu University of Science and Technology, and the West China University of Medical Sciences. Its four established main branches are the Liberal Arts and Sciences Library and Engineering Library at Wangjiang, the Medical Library at Huaxi, and the Jiang'an Library. The university's historical collections include Chinese thread-bound books, rare editions, local Sichuan materials, pre-1949 newspapers and periodicals, and specialist collections in engineering and medicine.

The Sichuan University Museum developed from the antiquities museum established at West China Union University in the early 20th century. Its present collections include more than 80,000 historical and cultural objects, together with substantial zoological, botanical, ethnographic, and archival collections. A new museum building, with more than 60,000 m^{2} (650,000 sq ft) of floor space and approximately 10,000 m^{2} (110,000 sq ft) of exhibition space, began trial operation in 2023. In May 2024, the Sichuan Provincial Cultural Heritage Administration announced that it had been designated a National First-Class Museum.

The university also maintains a university-history exhibition, medical and dental historical collections, art and cultural exhibition spaces, and memorial facilities documenting alumni and events in its institutional history.

== Organization ==
=== Campuses ===
Academic units are distributed across the university's four campuses rather than being organized as four separate universities. Wangjiang functions as the principal administrative campus and contains a broad range of humanities, social-science, science, and engineering units. Huaxi is centered on medical and health-sciences education and research. Jiang'an is used extensively for undergraduate teaching and also houses academic and interdisciplinary units. Meishan, which entered use in 2025, has been developed primarily for interdisciplinary research, advanced training, technology transfer, and university–regional collaboration.

=== Schools and departments ===
As of February 2026, Sichuan University had 37 discipline-based schools and academic departments, plus the Overseas Education College (for international students). Its current academic directory also lists specialized research, interdisciplinary, and joint-education units in addition to the discipline-based schools.

The university's schools and academic departments include:

Humanities and social sciences

- School of Economics
- College of Law
- College of Literature and Journalism
- College of Foreign Languages and Cultures
- College of Arts
- College of History and Culture (Tourism School and School of Archaeology and Museology)
- Department of Philosophy
- Department of Classics
- School of Public Administration
- Business School
- School of Marxism
- School of International Relations
- Institute for Disaster Management and Reconstruction
- School of Physical Education

Natural sciences

- College of Mathematics
- College of Physics
- College of Chemistry
- College of Life Sciences

Engineering and interdisciplinary fields

- School of Mechanical Engineering
- College of Materials Science and Engineering
- College of Electrical Engineering
- College of Electronics and Information Engineering
- College of Computer Science
- College of Architecture and Environment
- College of Water Resource and Hydropower
- College of Chemical Engineering
- College of Biomass Science and Engineering
- College of Polymer Science and Engineering
- School of Aeronautics and Astronautics
- School of Cyber Science and Engineering
- School of Biomedical Engineering
- College of Carbon Neutrality Future Technology
- School of Artificial Intelligence

Medicine and health sciences (West China Medical Center)

- West China School of Basic Medical Sciences and Forensic Medicine
- West China School of Clinical Medicine / West China Hospital
- West China Second University Hospital
- West China School of Stomatology / West China Hospital of Stomatology
- West China School of Public Health / West China Fourth Hospital
- West China School of Pharmacy

Other teaching and interdisciplinary units include the Overseas Education College, the Sichuan University–Pittsburgh Institute, the College of Excellent Engineers, and other joint or specialized programs. The university also operates research institutes that admit graduate students but are administratively distinct from its discipline-based schools, including institutes in atomic and molecular physics, nuclear science and technology, religious studies, and frontier medical science.

== Notable people ==
Since present-day Sichuan University was formed from several predecessor institutions, lists of its notable people include alumni and faculty of National Sichuan University and its predecessors, the Chengdu University of Science and Technology and its predecessors, and the West China Union University and its medical successors.

=== Alumni ===
- Zhu De – military commander and political leader, one of the Ten Marshals of the People's Liberation Army, and later chairman of the Standing Committee of the National People's Congress; identified by Sichuan University and People's Daily sources as an alumnus through the university's predecessor institutions.
- Guo Moruo – poet, writer, historian, and archaeologist; associated with the university's predecessor educational institutions and listed among Sichuan University's notable alumni.
- Ba Jin – novelist and essayist, best known for works including Family; listed among the university's notable alumni.
- Jiang Zhuyun – Chinese Communist revolutionary, popularly known as "Sister Jiang" (江姐); studied at National Sichuan University and is commemorated by the university in a memorial and historical exhibition.
- Dai Bingguo – diplomat and State Councillor from 2008 to 2013; graduated from Sichuan University's Department of Foreign Languages in 1964 after studying Russian.
- Jung Chang – British-Chinese writer, best known for Wild Swans; studied English at Sichuan University before leaving China for postgraduate study in Britain in 1978.
- Zhang Xingdong – biomedical materials scientist, member of the Chinese Academy of Engineering, and foreign member of the United States National Academy of Engineering; graduated from Sichuan University in 1960 and subsequently became a professor at the university.
- Meng Daqiao (蒙大桥) – nuclear-materials scientist and member of the Chinese Academy of Sciences; graduated from Sichuan University's Department of Chemistry in 1980 and received a doctorate from the university in 2002.
- Zhao Ermi – herpetologist and member of the Chinese Academy of Sciences; entered the biology department of West China Union University in 1947 and graduated in 1951. He later also served as a professor and doctoral supervisor at Sichuan University.

=== Faculty ===
- Zhang Lan – educator and political figure who served as the first president of National Chengdu University, a principal predecessor of National Sichuan University.
- Wu Yuzhang – revolutionary, historian, and educator who served as president of Chengdu Higher Normal School, a predecessor of Sichuan University, from 1922 to 1924; he later became the first president of the Renmin University of China.
- Ke Zhao – mathematician and member of the Chinese Academy of Sciences who served as professor, president, and honorary president of Sichuan University. His research included number theory and combinatorics; the Erdős–Ko–Rado theorem bears his name together with those of Paul Erdős and Richard Rado.
- Xu Xi (徐僖) – polymer scientist and member of the Chinese Academy of Sciences. He taught at the Chengdu Institute of Technology, the Chengdu University of Science and Technology, Sichuan Union University, and Sichuan University, and was a pioneer of polymer-materials education and research in China.
- Liu Yingming – mathematician and member of the Chinese Academy of Sciences who joined Sichuan University in 1963. He later served as a vice president of the university, dean of its graduate school, and director of its Institute of Mathematics.
- Zhang Xingdong – biomaterials scientist and professor whose research helped establish biomaterials as a major field at the university; he was elected to the Chinese Academy of Engineering in 2007.
- Zhao Ermi – herpetologist whose academic appointments included professorship and doctoral supervision at Sichuan University as well as research at the Chengdu Institute of Biology of the Chinese Academy of Sciences.

== See also ==
- Chengdu University of Science and Technology
- West China Union University
  - West China Medical Center
- List of universities and colleges in Sichuan
