= Zi Prefecture =

Zi Prefecture may refer to:

- Zi Prefecture (Sichuan) (資州), a prefecture between the 6th and 20th centuries in modern Sichuan, China
- Zi Prefecture (Shandong) (淄州), a prefecture between the 6th and 13th centuries in modern Shandong, China

== See also ==
- Zizhou (disambiguation)
- Zi (disambiguation)
