= Ailie Gale =

American physician and missionary

Ailie May Spencer Gale

Ailie May Spencer Gale (1878–1958) was an American physician. She served as a medical missionary in China under commission from the Methodist Episcopal Board of Missions from 1908 to 1950 alongside her husband Rev. Francis Gale, a religious missionary. Committed to a lifetime of unpaid social activism, Gale's work emphasized an approach to patient care that focused on preventative care and public health, humane treatment, and consideration for the whole patient, entailing concern for physical, spiritual, and intellectual needs. She also had evangelical motives and sought to promote the status of Chinese women.

Gale's years of service in China coincided with major political developments of the time, including the Chinese Civil War, Second Sino-Japanese War, Sino-American alliance during World War II, and implementation of a Communist government. The political and cultural climates created by these events had a great impact on Gale's work both in determining the needs she was to respond to and in influencing interactions between the Gales and the Chinese populations they served.

Gale kept active correspondence with her supporters back in the American home field. As a female surgeon in the twentieth century who wrote about her medical successes and spoke at public events, Gale broke into fields dominated by men in the twentieth century—medicine and public speaking—and gave credibility to women's capability for professionalism and leadership. Her readers were encouraged to consider women as active players in the international realm rather than solely restricted to the domestic sphere. At the same time, historians have noted Gale's role in uplifting upper-middle class white Protestant women at the expense of Chinese women, whose religious practices (or lack thereof) and non-Western medicine she considered inferior.

Gale returned to New York in 1950 and died in 1958 at the age of 79.

== Background ==
=== Early life ===
Ailie Gale was born in 1878 in Bozeman, Montana to Moses Harrison Spencer, a Methodist circuit rider and dentist, and Elizabeth Spencer. She had one brother, John Spencer. Her upbringing was shaped by her father's fundamentalist beliefs, which allowed for no dissent and no fun. Rather, education and religious piety were highly emphasized.

=== Education ===
Gale began attending Colorado College at age 20 while working as a housekeeper and cook in order to financially support herself. Despite the death of her parents and increasing financial hardship after graduation, Gale continued her education at Cooper Medical College in San Francisco in 1902. There, she became involved with the Epworth League and Student Volunteer Movement, serving on missionary trips and eventually becoming president of the Student Volunteer chapter of the University of California at Berkeley. In 1905, she received her medical degree with specialization in surgery.

While on furlough from her missionary work in Nanchang in 1922, Gale took postgraduate medical courses at Columbia Medical College in preparation for her work in Tunxi (Tunki), Anhui.

=== Personal life ===
Ailie Spencer married Francis Gale, then a theology student, in 1905, thereby changing her name to Ailie Gale. Although her husband received a salary that she did not, Francis Gale himself recognized and was often involved in Ailie's work. He was one of her most vocal supporters.

Together, they raised four children, three sons and an adopted Chinese daughter, Mary Gao Chen. Gale found Mary abandoned at the gate of the Nanchang Hospital as a one-month-old. While Mary was raised as Christian, Mary's upbringing also emphasized her Chinese identity as she was taught the Chinese language and wore traditional clothes. Gale impressed upon her from childhood the importance of her future role in serving the Chinese people and the precedence public service work took over marriage. Mary grew up to become a nurse working in public health, expressing interest in Chinese politics as well as showing talent as a leader and administrator.

== Medical missionary work in China ==
=== Call to mission work ===
Although Gale received her medical degree, she did not take state board examinations, determined to utilize her medical skills in the mission rather than in America. Additionally, opportunities for medical work were scant for women in America, who faced discrimination in the male-dominated field; Gale was one of only four women in her graduating class from Cooper Medical College. China, on the other hand, had many opportunities for women physicians on account of the Manchu abdication of 1911 and new Republican government's recognition of Western medicine after the North Manchurian Plague of 1910 and 1911, and a dire dearth of physicians that left Chinese communities underserved. Nevertheless, there still existed some conflict over the imposition of Western medicine over traditional Chinese healing practices.

Gale's mission work was also driven by a desire to spread Christianity, and especially to empower women through Christianity, rather than professional gain. She worked in Nanchang, Tunxi, the Shanghai American School, Nanjing, and Zizhou as an administrator and physician/surgeon in hospitals, dispensaries, and schools.

=== Nanchang, Jiangxi: 1908–21 ===
Gale's arrival in Nanchang in 1908 with her husband and sons Otis Spencer and Lester Sinclair coincided with the death of the Empress Dowager Cixi, which signaled a break from traditional Chinese society and the beginning of the acceptance of Western medicine by 1911. Here, Gale held three positions at Methodist institutions. She worked as chief administer at the Nanchang General Hospital until 1922, the only physician available to serve thirty hospital beds and two outside dispensaries until 1920, the year she finally had a Chinese physician join as her assistant. She was also the school physician and industrial class teacher for the Stephen L. Baldwin Memorial Girls' School starting in 1910 and provided medical services for the Women's Foreign Missionary Society's Women and Children's Hospital. In addition to overseeing and performing most of the medical work and surgical operations in each location, Gale also made house calls. All social classes were accounted for: treatment for the poor was free, financed by fees to upper-class patients.

She also served as a role model for female independence "the rapidly growing numbers of modernized Chinese women" as Chinese women "began their fight for a public role in the new democracy" and built a close relationship with the women she served. She further encouraged interaction through invitations to eat dinner with "interesting Chinese guests" in published letters in Woman's Missionary Friend.

=== Tunxi, Anhui: 1923–27 ===
After returning home to complete postgraduate medical courses at Columbia Medical College, the Gale family again arrived in China in the Tunxi area in 1923 with three male nurses trained by Gale in Nanchang. The Board had commissioned Rev. Gale to continue evangelical work and Dr. Gale to take over medical work.

Gale's time in Tunxi was characterized by two major complications: lack of funding and rising anti-foreign sentiment in China. By the 1920s, post-WWI disillusionment, as well as financially stressed Protestant churches, had contributed to the loss of interest in missionary work. As a result, funding from Methodist Episcopal Church Board became scarce, even threatening to force the Gales to leave their missionary post in Tunxi altogether. However, Gale took advantage of the increasingly important relationship she had with supporters in the home field and was able to continue medical work, including building the Tunxi General Hospital, relying solely upon monetary donations and gifts. Her letters became even more emphatic in relating how vital these gifts were as well as the gratitude of Chinese patients. She also raised money from local Chinese contributions and medical fees to wealthier patients.

The rise of anti-imperialist and anti-Christian sentiment and protests as a result of the growing Chinese Nationalist Movement antagonized the relationship between missionaries, seen by many as representatives of Western domination, and the local Chinese population. However, Gale was able to evade attack because of her connections with a local government school, hiring graduates as nurses and befriending Buddhist teachers and students there. This relationship extended military protection over the Tunxi Hospital, where Gale treated both Southern and Northern soldiers. Gale had the full support of Tunxi officials, receiving a Merit Board from military officials, soldiers, and the police commissioner as they asked the Gales to remain in Tunxi.

Gale ran a self-directed and self-administered public health campaign starting in 1925 with malaria as its main target issue. Putting a spin on the nationalist "kill the Japs" pamphlets widely distributed by students at the time, Gale and her nurses handed out "kill the fly" pamphlets. The campaign culminated in a week of public health in May 1926 with health parades of school children, nurses, and religious workers carrying banners and Chinese national flags, sanitation lectures held by hospital representatives, and musical entertainment. It was widely popular among Tunxi residents, and attendants included the police force and members of the Chamber of Commerce. The campaign was seen as a great success, both educating and encouraging enthusiasm among the Tunxi population. Afterwards, wire screen covers were manufactured by the Tunxi population and widely used in candy and fruit shops as protection against mosquitoes.

=== The Shanghai American School: 1927–33 ===
In April 1927, the American Consulate ordered an evacuation from Tunxi in response to escalating anti-foreign sentiment and the potential for violent attacks. The Gales, along with over 75,000 other foreigners, moved to Shanghai where Ailie Gale became a physician and preceptress at the Shanghai American School.

The missionary station in Tunxi was eventually closed by the Board in December 1931 due to lack of funding, exacerbated by the worldwide depression.

=== Nanjing: 1933–39 ===
During her time in Nanjing, Methodist missionary objectives shifted to emphasize the economic and social needs of rural China rather than evangelical efforts in response to the deteriorating economy. Gale continued her work in a holistic approach to preventative health at two clinics, established by herself, and Ginling College, established by women's Baptist, Methodist, and Presbyterian societies to "offer special courses in premedical sciences, in education," and "in religion, fitting women students for service in the three fields of ministry to the needs of body, mind and spirit". Gale was satisfied with her placement in the College as it, with its faculty and Nationalist government backing, promoted education in order to empower a more active public role for women. Here, she held a public health clinic, once performing three hundred physical exams within one week. In addition to her role as a physician, Gale was also an educator and saw herself as a role model who collaborated with her students on public health projects and invited them to her home for meals.

Gale became closely associated with the Nationalist movement through her interest in the social programs for rural Chinese populations proposed by the New Life Movement and a friendly relationship with George Shepherd, one of the main Western advisors of the movement appointed by Chiang Kai-shek. Shepherd would often room in the Gales' home while traveling, and it was through him and his close affiliation with Chiang that Gale would learn much of the latest political happenings that she would later relate to her readers.

=== Zizhou, Zizhong: 1941–47 ===
Gale served as hospital administrator for five years at Chadwick Memorial Hospital in Zizhou, Sichuan province. Her responsibilities included overseeing women's clinics, nurses in the hospital, and religious work. As the hospital was struggling from lack of funding and nurse shortages upon her arrival, she also took on a role managing finances and taking on duties usually filled by nurses with some of the infant patients there. She worked towards a goal of restoring the hospital's reputation and establishing trust between the hospital and the populations it served. She was also concerned with making medical care more accessible for the poor.

To these ends, Gale was successful in renovating the hospital and nurses' quarters as well as acquiring modern technology such as an x-ray machine and ultimately in attracting more patients to the Chadwick Hospital. She also began a half-time day school for poor Chinese children in 1942 and set up a "poor fund" that allowed the hospital to provide services to those who could not pay. Much of this was made possible by supporter contributors from the home field.

Due to rising political tension and the invasion of Japanese troops in 1944, the American embassy at Chongqing ordered the evacuation of missionaries in 1945. Gale initially refused, citing full faith in the Allied forces' ability to quell violence, but ultimately left in the following years to reunite with her husband, recently released from a Japanese internment camp, as she recognized escalating political conflict.

=== Nanchang: 1947–50 ===
Gale returned to Nanchang in June 1947, joining her husband again at the Nanchang General Hospital which had been completely restored and staffed after destruction during Japanese occupation. Gale instead turned her attention to the Nanchang Boys' Academy, which at the time had neither a nurse nor a doctor. During these later years of service, she suffered from illness and an infected kidney; nevertheless, she continued work and ran the boys' clinic, seeing about 200 boys daily, and raised funds for medical supplies.

Throughout her years in China, Gale had protested Communism for its opposition to religion, as a Methodist and believer in Christian social activism herself, and for its rule that everyone must work to eat, as she believed that the most needy of society needed to be considered in a different light. Ultimately it was the Communist victory of Chinese Communist Revolution in 1949 that necessitated her final departure out of China as the Methodist Episcopal Board gave formal orders that cut all foreign personnel. On August 14, 1950, she returned to New York.

== Legacy ==
=== Correspondence with supporters ===
Throughout her time as a medical missionary, Gale maintained a close relationship with her supporters through quarterly letters that were widely distributed through journals, newsletters, church services, and both secular and religious newspapers. This close connection proved essential in times when Gale's missionary funds ran low and her work became substantially funded through supporter contributions. To this end, Gale focused on communicating her many medical successes (rather than failures) and the gratitude of Chinese patients in order to recognize the significance of contributor participation in her missionary work and maintain her audience.

Gale's letters also played a significant role in shaping the perception of women's roles in society as well as influencing the perception of China and Chinese women by the American public.

=== Women's roles in America ===
Women's missionary societies of the late 19th and early 20th centuries were the first organized women's movement for American churches, allowing typically white, upper-middle-class women to take on a greater role in the public sphere than before. Gale's medical missionary work and correspondence with her supporters was notable for the ways in which she broke into male-dominated fields and represented her own success. She challenged the notion that women were incapable of taking on leadership roles or performing complicated surgeries as she did both, successfully, in the many hospitals and clinics she ran in China, overseeing populations of over 1 million. Her position, as self-represented in her letters, was as a powerful older woman and role model for both American and Chinese women. Further credibility was given through the frequent commendations she received from both Chinese and missionary men for her work. Gale's respected status also validated her approach to medicine, typically regarded as "feminine" and therefore inferior, which focused on preventative care and concern for the patient over highly scientific and emotionless diagnosis of disease.

Although public speaking was typically restricted for women, Gale's religious drive led her to engage in frequent speaking engagements during her time in America between—she "spoke confidently because she believed that prayer would bring guidance from the Holy Spirit." Gale's active interest and involvement in Chinese politics encouraged her female audience in America to participate in public and international affairs; often she would emphasize the precedence social work took over marriage. One woman supporter inspired by Gale's work was lifelong friend Miss Priscilla Burtis, a home field missionary and parishioner who distributed many of Gale's letters and dedicated her life to social activism, never marrying.

=== Role in Sino-American relations ===
American missionaries in the 20th century played a significant role in shaping the public's perception of world affairs as they "put a human face on foreign peoples and cultures for ordinary Americans." Gale's letters portrayed her close relationship with the Chinese patients, students, nurses, and other community members she interacted with on a daily basis, thereby bringing her American audience closer to what was largely a foreign people. In particular her readers grew attached to Gale's adopted daughter Mary Gao through the intimate stories Gale would relate about her growth in her letters, and Gale frequently expressed her respect for the Chinese authorities and healthcare workers she worked with. Gale's projection of a strong, accessible, and respectable China contrasted drastically with common perceptions through the early 1900s of China as servile and weak with a backwards culture and government and ultimately had a significant role in shaping public opinion because her letters reached such a wide audience. This was especially notable during World War II as it was the willingness of the public to support China that shaped American foreign policy and the Sino-American alliance. Gale was one of many missionaries who influenced a national effort put in place by President Roosevelt to donate to relief for China through the American Red Cross during the 1930s-40s.

Despite Gale's respect for Chinese culture and acceptance of traditional Chinese religions such as Buddhism as a Liberal Protestant who allowed a more flexible interpretation of her religion, she was still committed in her mission to bring Christianity to China and has been described as a cultural imperialist, like many women Christian missionaries.

In her correspondence to supporters, Gale suggested that piety could empower, not only other women, but also races and nations, rendering people of all races equals. Gale often expressed a horizontal, rather than a vertical or hierarchical, worldview that while Christians of all genders and races were superior to non-Christians, Chinese and Westerners, like men and women, should work side by side. These assertions were understood by women supporters, as the language mirrored that of nineteenth-century Protestant women missionary workers who had subverted male power by asserting their obligation to serve God alongside their male counterparts. ...Despite this...Gale was a cultural imperialist in her unwavering insistence that the Chinese needed to replace their religious beliefs with Christianity, a Western import. While professing the need for cooperation, she consistently placed herself in a position of power, where she delegated, rather than accepted, orders to both white and Chinese men and women. Gale did not question her own nation's, or Western political dominance over China in general.

— M. Cristina Zaccarini, The Sino-American Friendship as Tradition and Challenge (2001)

=== Honors ===
Gale was recognized by many Chinese authorities throughout her years of service. Often she would receive commendations and merit boards, such as a 1918 proclamation by Nanchang's chief of Police Yien Ngen-yung that described Gale as "an American eminent doctor of medicine. Since she has taken charge of Nanchang Hospital all her surgical operations have been very successful." This proclamation reached even secular audiences when it was printed in the San Francisco Examiner in 1919. Civil Governor Tsi of the Ministry of Home Affairs at Beijing recognized her with a merit board, celebrated with a parade down the streets and posted on a public wall. For providing medical services to soldiers of the Northern and Southern armies during her time in Anhui, she was given memorial tablets from both armies. She received a written tribute from the China Inland Missionary for her forty years of service in China, which included recognition from Chinese colleagues for her professionalism as a surgeon and medical doctor, bravery, and generosity.

== See also ==
- Methodism in Sichuan
