= Zizhou =

Zizhou may refer to:

== People ==
- Gongbo Liao (c. 5th century BC), courtesy name Zizhou (子周), a disciple of Confucius

== Modern locations ==
- Zizhou County (子洲县) in Shaanxi, China

== Historical locations ==
- Zi Prefecture (Sichuan) (資州), a prefecture between the 6th and 20th centuries in modern Sichuan, China
- Zi Prefecture (Shandong) (淄州), a prefecture between the 6th and 13th centuries in modern Shandong, China
