= Ma'an, Neijiang =

Ma'an 马鞍镇
- Town
- Ma'anzhen
- Location in Sichuan
- Coordinates: 29°51′37″N 104°58′40″E
- Country: People's Republic of China
- Province: Sichuan
- Autonomous prefecture: Neijiang
- County: Zizhong County

Area
  - Total: 41.43 km^{2} (16.00 sq mi)

Population (2010)
  - Total: 27,402
  - Density: 661.4/km^{2} (1,713/sq mi)
- Time zone: UTC+8 (China Standard)

Ma'an (Mandarin: 马鞍镇) is a town in Zizhong County, Neijiang, Sichuan, China. In 2010, Ma'an had a total population of 27,402: 14,391 males and 13,011 females: 4,755 aged under 14, 19,530 aged between 15 and 65 and 3,117 aged over 65.
