= History of Methodism in Sichuan =

History and implantation of Methodism in Sichuan

The history of Methodism in Sichuan (or "West China") (Note: Sichuan, formerly romanized as Szechwan, Szechuan, Sz-chuan, or Sz-chuen; also referred to as "West China".) began in 1882 when missionaries began to arrive from the United States. Methodists founded or helped found several colleges, schools, and hospitals to aid in modernization and conversion efforts. Later, American Methodists were joined by missionaries from Canada. Methodism grew to become one of the two largest denominations of Protestant Christianity in the province by 1922, along with Anglicanism.

Nonetheless, missionary activity in China generated controversy among many native Chinese and faced armed opposition during both the Boxer Rebellion and the later Chinese Communist Revolution. Although the former did not affect Sichuan so much as some other parts of China, the province was one of the hotbeds of anti-missionary riots throughout its ecclesiastical history.

Numerous mission properties and native church leaders in Sichuan were respectively destroyed and killed by communists in the mid-1930s. After the communist take over of China in 1949, missionaries were expelled and activity ceased. Under government oppression in the 1950s, Methodists and other Protestants across China severed their ties with overseas churches and their congregations merged into the Three-Self Patriotic Church. Since 1980, services for Chinese Protestant churches have been provided by the China Christian Council.

== History ==
=== American Methodist Episcopal Mission ===
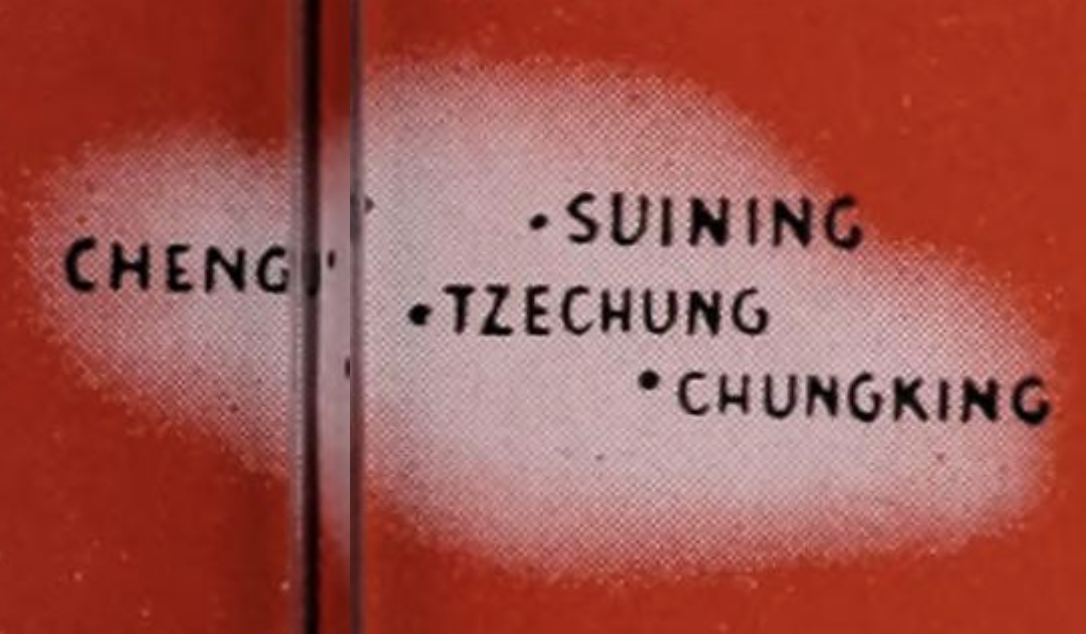
American Methodist Episcopal Mission field in Sichuan

The first Methodist missionaries to reach Sichuan were those of the American Methodist Episcopal Mission (AMEM) led by Rev. Lucius Nathan Wheeler, who arrived in Chongqing in 1882. In 1884, Francis Dunlap Gamewell was assigned to this city as superintendent of the West China Mission. Their early efforts encountered strong resistance and riots that led to the abandonment of the mission. It was not until 1889 that these Methodists came back and started the mission again.

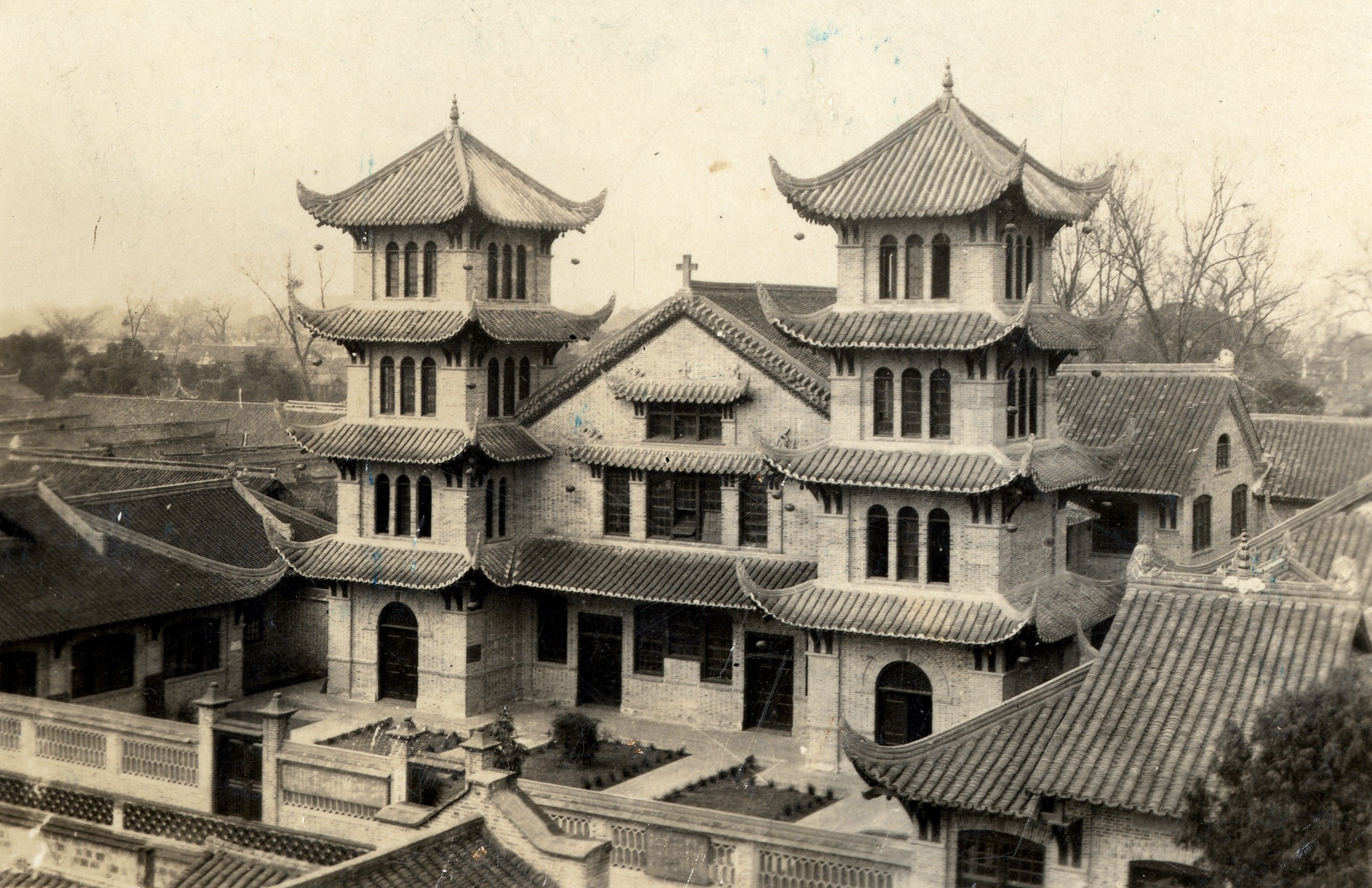
American Methodist Institutional Church at Chengdu, circa 1920

The AMEM mission work concentrated within a diamond-shaped area with the cities of Chengdu (Chengtu), Suining, Zizhong (Tzechung) and Chongqing (Chungking) as bases. Apart from being one of the four founding societies of the West China Union University in 1910, the AMEM had several colleges, schools and hospitals in those above-mentioned cities, as well as an Institutional Church in Chengdu and a Lewis Memorial Institutional Church in Chongqing.

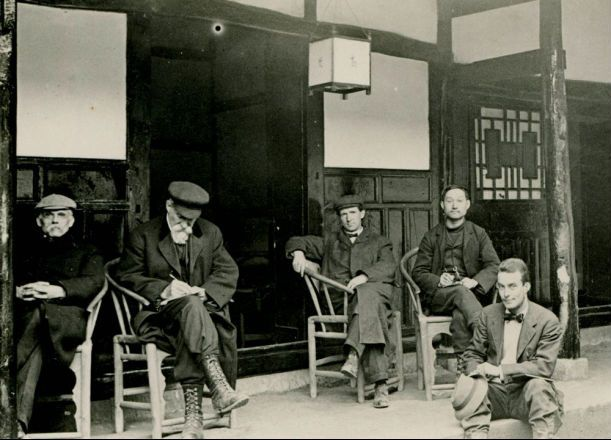
Joseph Beech (third from left) with (l to r) E. D. Burton (American Baptist biblical scholar), T. C. Chamberlin (American geologist), Y. T. Wang (interpreter) and R. T. Chamberlin (T. C. Chamberlin's son) at Santai, Sichuan, during an exploratory trip through China in 1909 as part of the Oriental Educational Investigation Commission.

The Rev. Dr. Joseph Beech, a Wesleyan University graduate and member of Psi Upsilon and Phi Beta Kappa, played an instrumental role in founding and running West China Union University. He served as its founding president and later its chancellor.

Ailie Gale served as hospital administrator for five years at Chadwick Memorial Hospital in Zizhong beginning in 1941. She left in 1946 to reunite with her husband, as she recognized escalating political conflict.

During the 1940s, the Church's work in the Chengdu area was directed by W. Y. Chen, one of the four Methodist bishops in China.

=== Canadian Methodist Mission ===
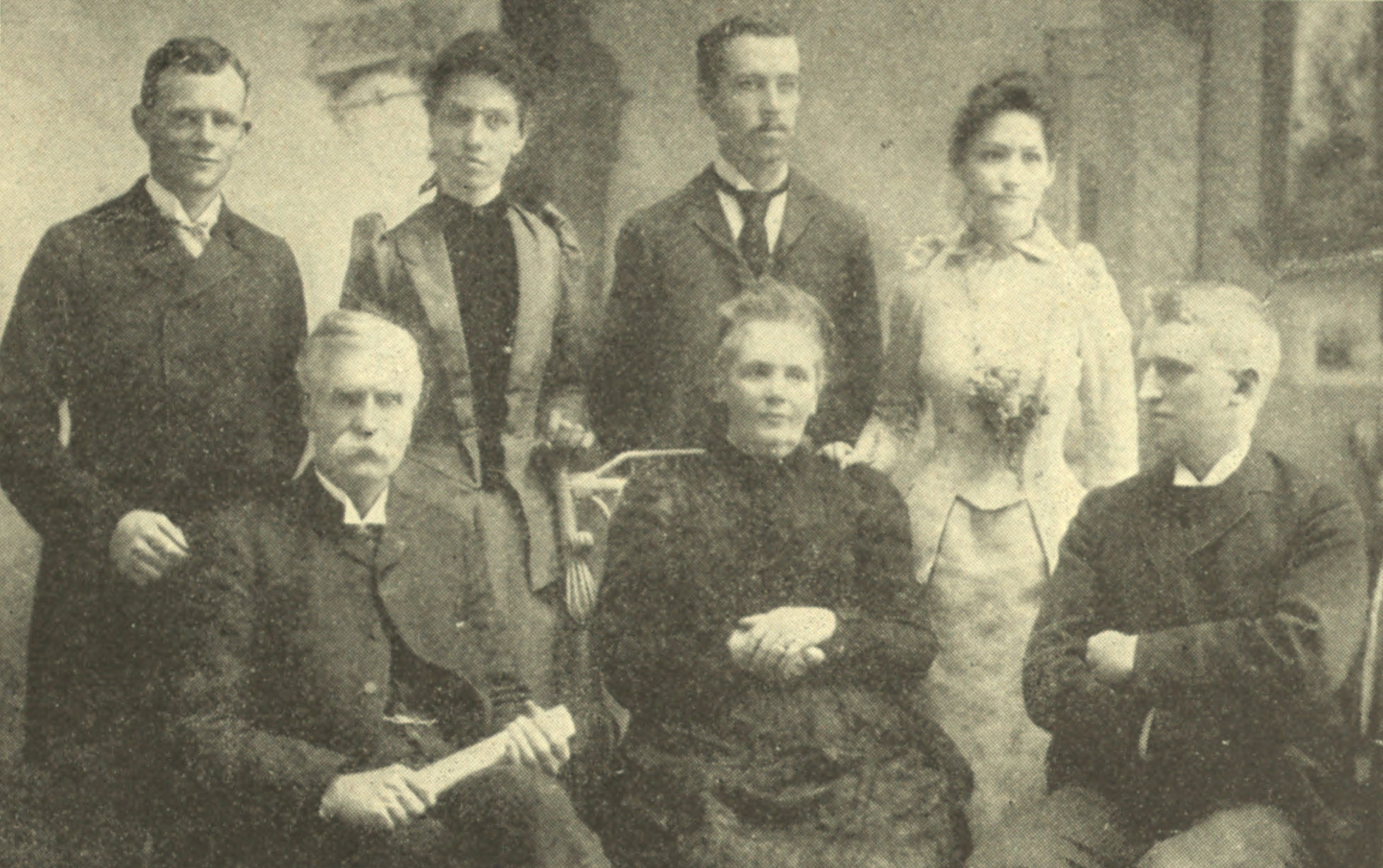
First Canadian Methodist missionaries to Sichuan, sailed in 1891. From left to right, standing: Rev. G. E. Hartwell, Mrs. Hartwell, Rev. O. L. Kilborn, Mrs. Kilborn. Seated: Rev. V. C. Hart, Mrs. Hart, Dr. D. W. Stevenson.

In 1891, a West China Mission group of the Missionary Society of the Methodist Church in Canada (MCC) was formed in Toronto, consisting of four missionaries and their wives. Two of the men were ministers (Virgil C. Hart, founder of the mission, and George E. Hartwell), and two were doctors (Omar L. Kilborn and David W. Stevenson). Before their departure, a farewell service was held in Elm Street Methodist Church, Toronto. They left Canada for China on 4 October.

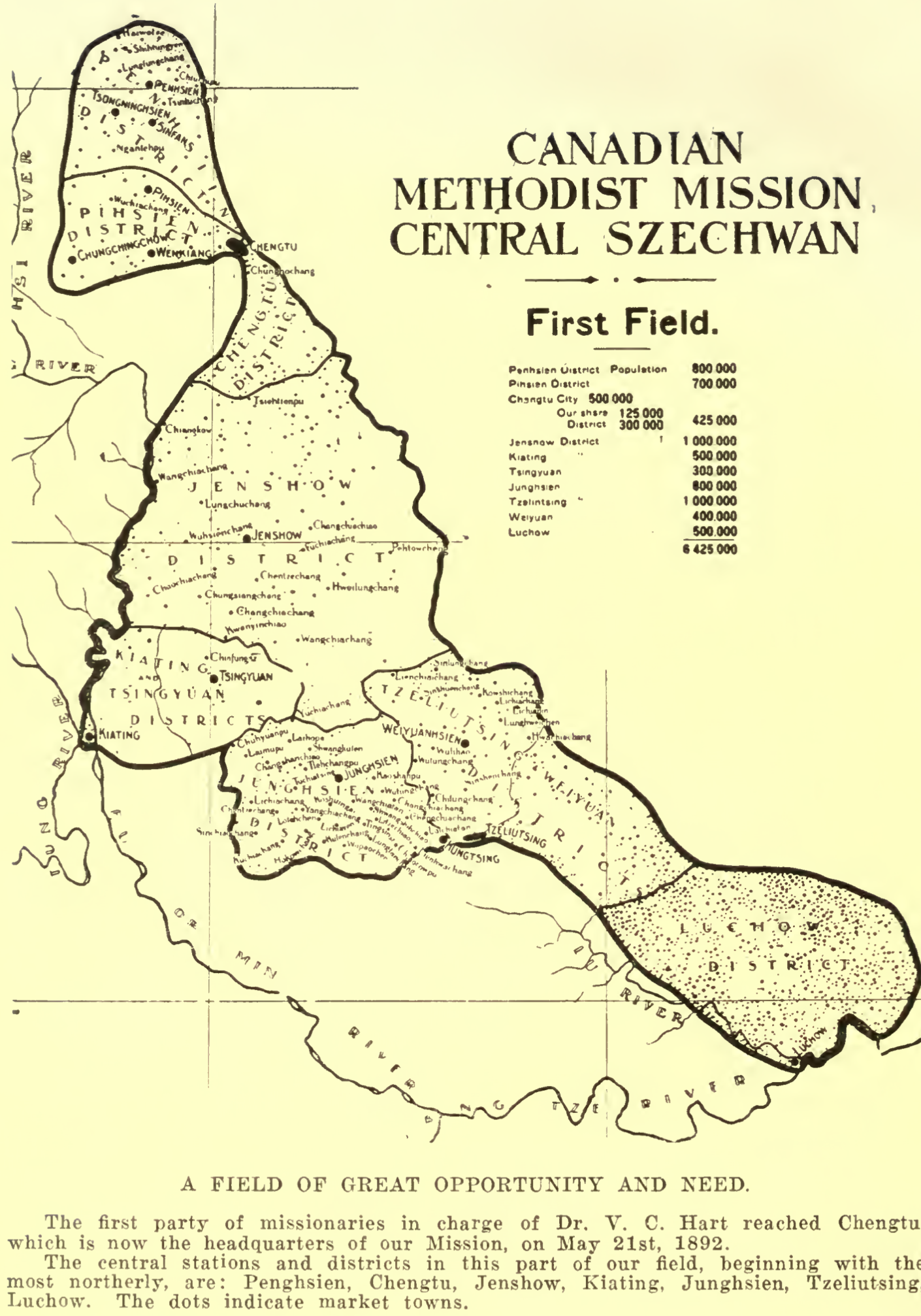
Canadian Methodist Mission in Central Sichuan (Szechwan)

The party arrived in the provincial capital Chengdu the following year. Work began immediately in the capital, and two years later, in Jiading (Kiatingfu), with the establishment of mission stations in both cities. The mission's first church and hospital were subsequently built in Chengdu. On April 16, 1893, the missionaries welcomed their first convert, a woman. She impressed the missionaries with her straightforward manner, a rare trait in a Chinese, and by her remarkable progress in learning to read.

In 1895, a serious outbreak of anti-foreign agitation spread throughout the province. In Chengdu, all the MCC mission property was entirely destroyed; and all missionaries of all missions, Protestant and Roman Catholic alike, were thankful to escape with their lives.

The West China Missionary News, printed by Canadian Methodist Mission Press

In 1897, the Canadian Methodist Mission Press was established in Jiading, but was moved to the capital city of Chengdu in 1903. This press produced publications mostly in English, Tibetan, Chinese and Hua Miao, but also printed language lessons in French and German. In addition to printing for the various missions in the western province, a certain amount of work was done for local schools and non-missionary foreigners. Notable among its printings was The West China Missionary News, first published in 1899, being the first and longest-running English-language newspaper in Sichuan province.

Six of the Victoria Eight were sent to Sichuan: N. E. Bowles (Chengdu [Chengtu]), H. D. Robertson (Chengdu), W. E. Sibley (Pengzhou [Penghsien]), E. W. Wallace (Chongqing [Chungking]), C. J. P. Jolliffe (Luzhou [Luchow]), and E. W. Morgan (Fuzhou [Fowchow]).

In 1906, eight Victoria College students formed the Victoria Eight, nicknamed "The Missionary Gang" to China and Japan. They left Canada in November. Acta Victoriana celebrated their departure by publishing in the November 1906 issue the students' graduating photographs on the journal's frontispiece, and a poem titled "L'Envoi" by Edward Wilson Wallace, one of the Eight. Six of these men were sent to Sichuan, where they arrived in 1910 after two years of language learning.

After 1900, eight more mission stations were established in Renshou (Jenshow, 1905), Rongxian (Junghsien, 1905), Pengzhou (Penghsien, 1907), Ziliujing (Tzeliutsing, 1907), Luzhou (Luchow, 1908), Chongqing (Chungking, 1910), Zhongzhou (Chungchow, 1911) and Fuzhou (Fowchow, 1913). The MCC missionaries travelled through the province building churches and residential compounds with missionary houses. They rented or bought local buildings to run services, prayer meetings and Bible study classes. They preached in markets and church halls, established day schools and boarding schools at the primary and high schools for both boys and girls, besides opening orphanages. The medical missionaries opened clinics, dispensaries, and hospitals. They served in the province's Red Cross work during the years 1913–16.

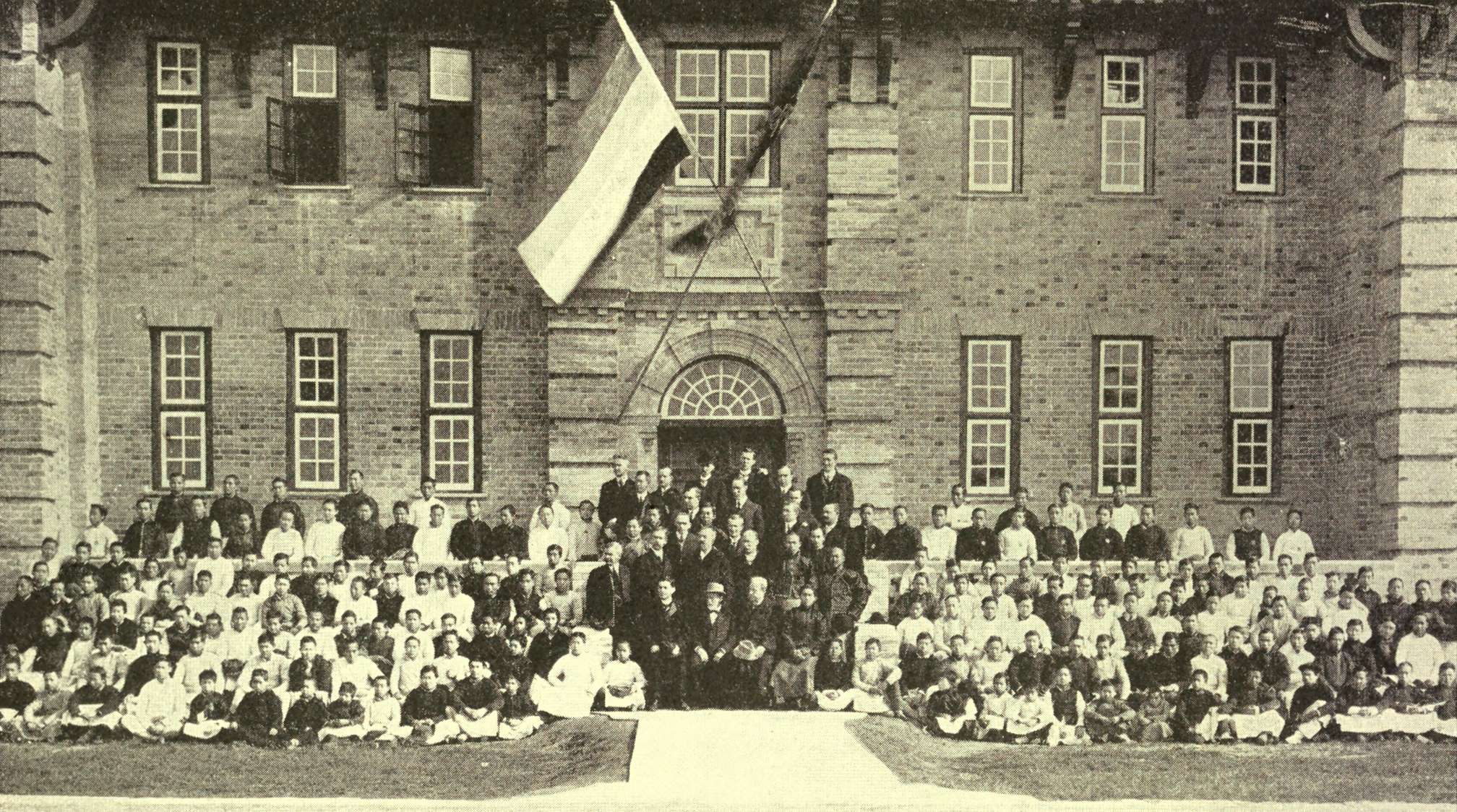
Faculty, students and guests of the West China Union University and Middle School. The guests include Bishop Bashford, Rev. Dr. Goucher, Fuh, Military Governor, and Chʻen, Civil Governor of Sichuan. 1915 or 1916.

The MCC was one of the four mission societies responsible for the creation of West China Union University in 1910, together with American Baptist Foreign Mission Society (American Baptist Churches USA), American Methodist Episcopal Mission (Methodist Episcopal Church), and Friends' Foreign Mission Association (British Quakers). There they opened their own Hart College, and the university's Medical and Dentistry Departments owed their success to these Canadian missionaries. That same year (1910), the MCC took over Chongqing district from London Missionary Society.

In 1917, the Silver Jubilee of the founding of the West China Mission was celebrated among Canadian Methodists. On May 27, 1918, the MCC had its first preparatory conference held at Rongxian. At this conference, the first local missionary was appointed and sent to the hill tribes northwest of Chengdu. The personnel of the conference included missionaries, evangelists, probationers, and lay delegates.

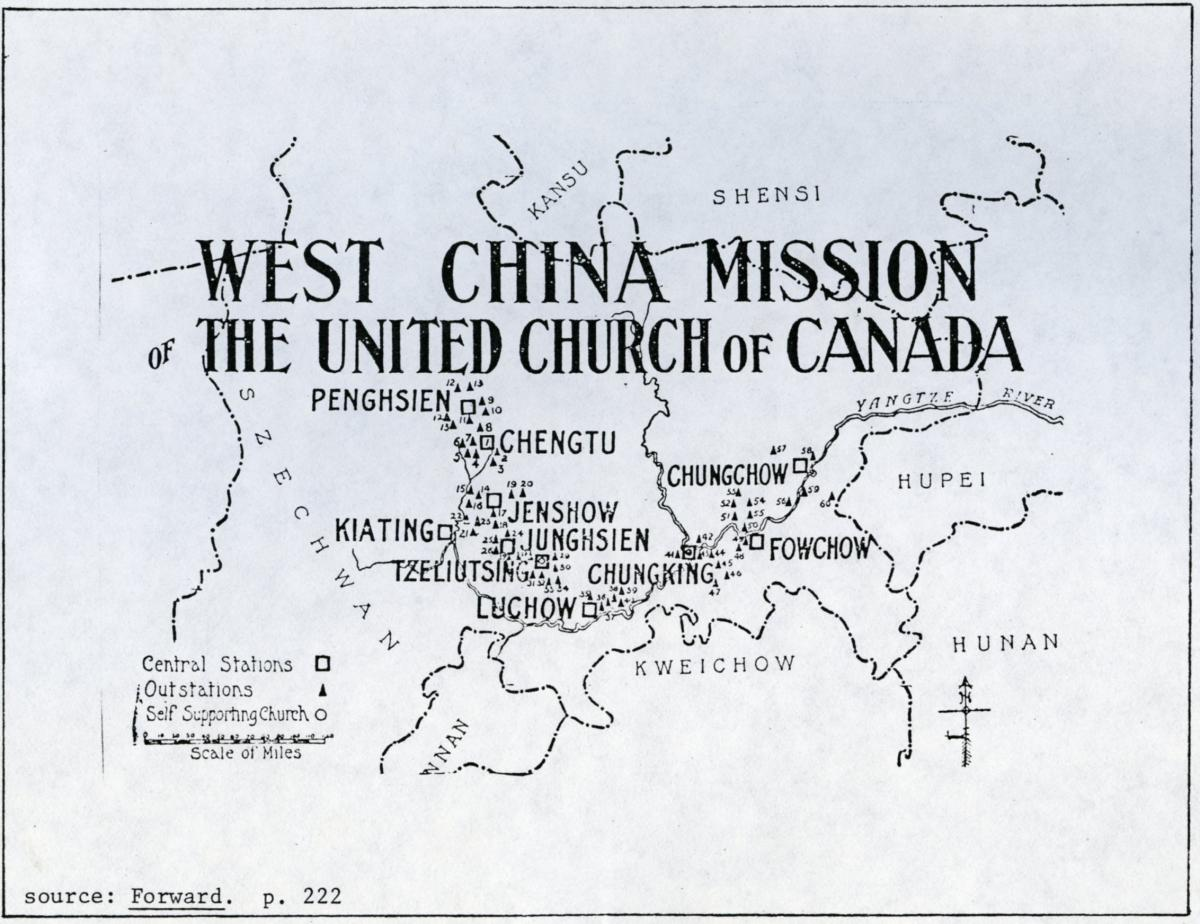
West China Mission of the United Church of Canada

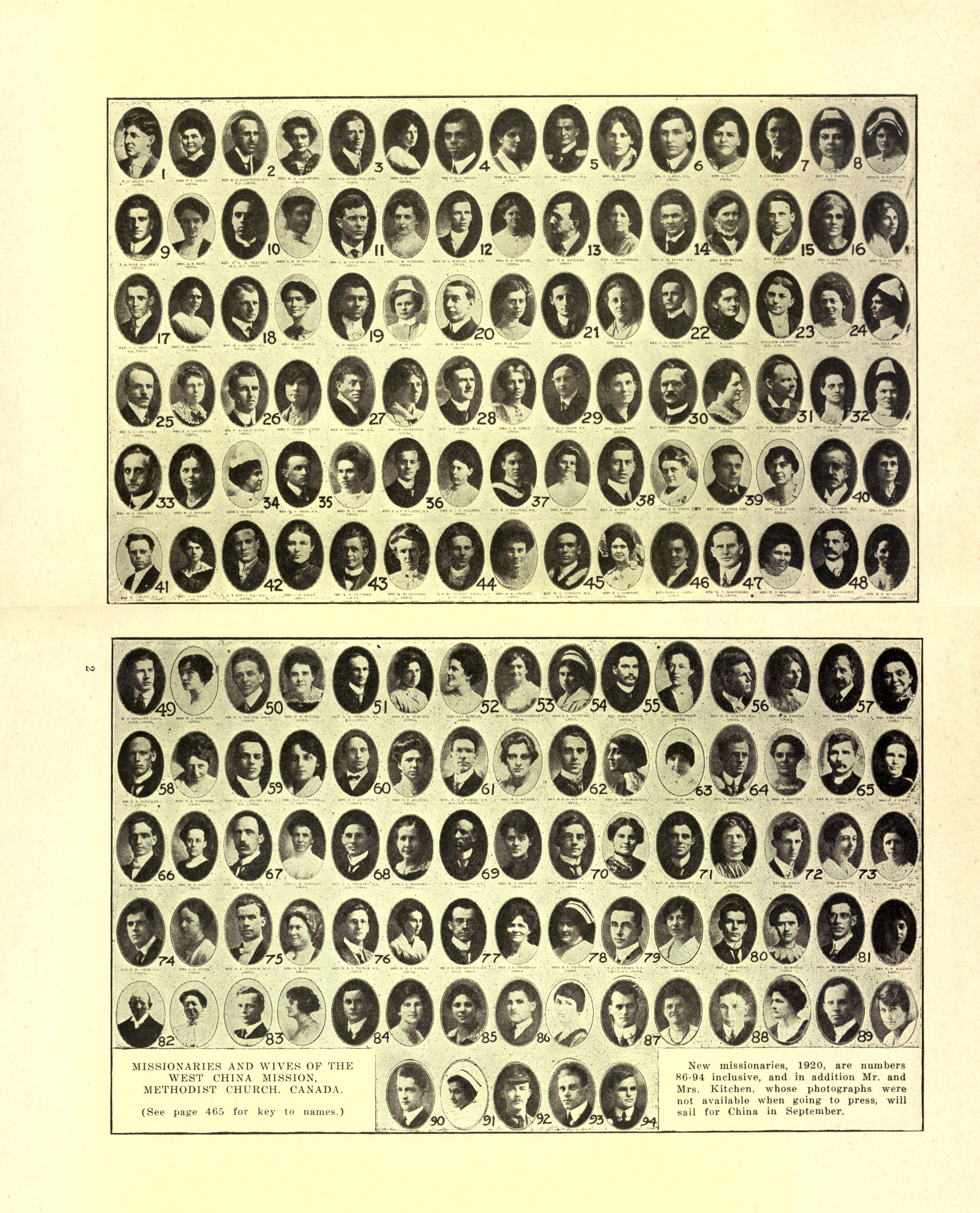
Canadian Methodist missionaries stationed in Sichuan by 1920

By the end of 1921, the Methodists enrolled almost one half of the Protestant Christians in Sichuan, making it (along with Anglicanism) one of the province's two largest Protestant sects. Following the merger of the Methodist Church of Canada into the United Church of Canada in 1925, the latter assumed responsibility for the MCC. At that time, the MCC was the largest mission of the newly-founded Church. There were 10 central stations, 8 hospitals, 10 dispensaries, 10 higher primary schools, 2 middle schools and 126 lower primary schools, as well as 214 Canadians, both men and women, working as mission staff. Each station executed missionary work in three forms: evangelistic, educational, and medical. As a whole, the mission created a Christian community of about 10,000 people. In 1927, many Canadian missionaries were ordered to evacuate Sichuan due to communist uprisings and the subsequent Chinese Civil War. This evacuation led to a number of staff resignations which caused a decline in the West China Mission work.

During the middle 1930s, Church property in Lifan, Maozhou (Maochow), Weizhou (Weikiu), and Zagunao (Tzagulao) was largely destroyed by Communist troops, pastors and converts were killed, and most of the villages between Lifan and Zagunao were burnt by Communists. When the soldiers evacuated the Lifan valley, they destroyed the people's homes and dumped surplus food into cesspools as they could not carry off. After the Communists left, the Nationalist troops who arrived took whatever they wanted without paying for them. By 1934, the MCC had joined the Church of Christ in China (CCC); an annual general meeting of the CCC's Sichuan Synod was held on February 9, 1939.

== Since 1949 ==
After the Communist takeover of China in 1949, missionaries were expelled, most church activities were banned, and all mission schools and hospitals were taken over by the government. Protestant Churches in China were also forced to sever their ties with respective overseas Churches, which has thus led to the merging of all the denominations into Communist-sanctioned Three-Self Patriotic Church. The China Christian Council was founded at the third national Christian conference in 1980 to unite and provide services for Protestant churches, formulating Church Order and encouraging theological education. In 2018, the detention of 100 Christians in Sichuan, including their pastor Wang Yi, raised concerns about religious crackdown in China.

The history of Canadian West China Mission was largely forgotten by both Canada and China, and once suppressed by Chinese government not keen to acknowledge the work of foreign faith workers, until, according to Nathan VanderKlippe's report in 2017, "the past few years, [...] the story of the West China Mission is now being revived with a caveat. The missionaries are not referred to as such. They are, instead, called 'volunteers'."

== Gallery ==
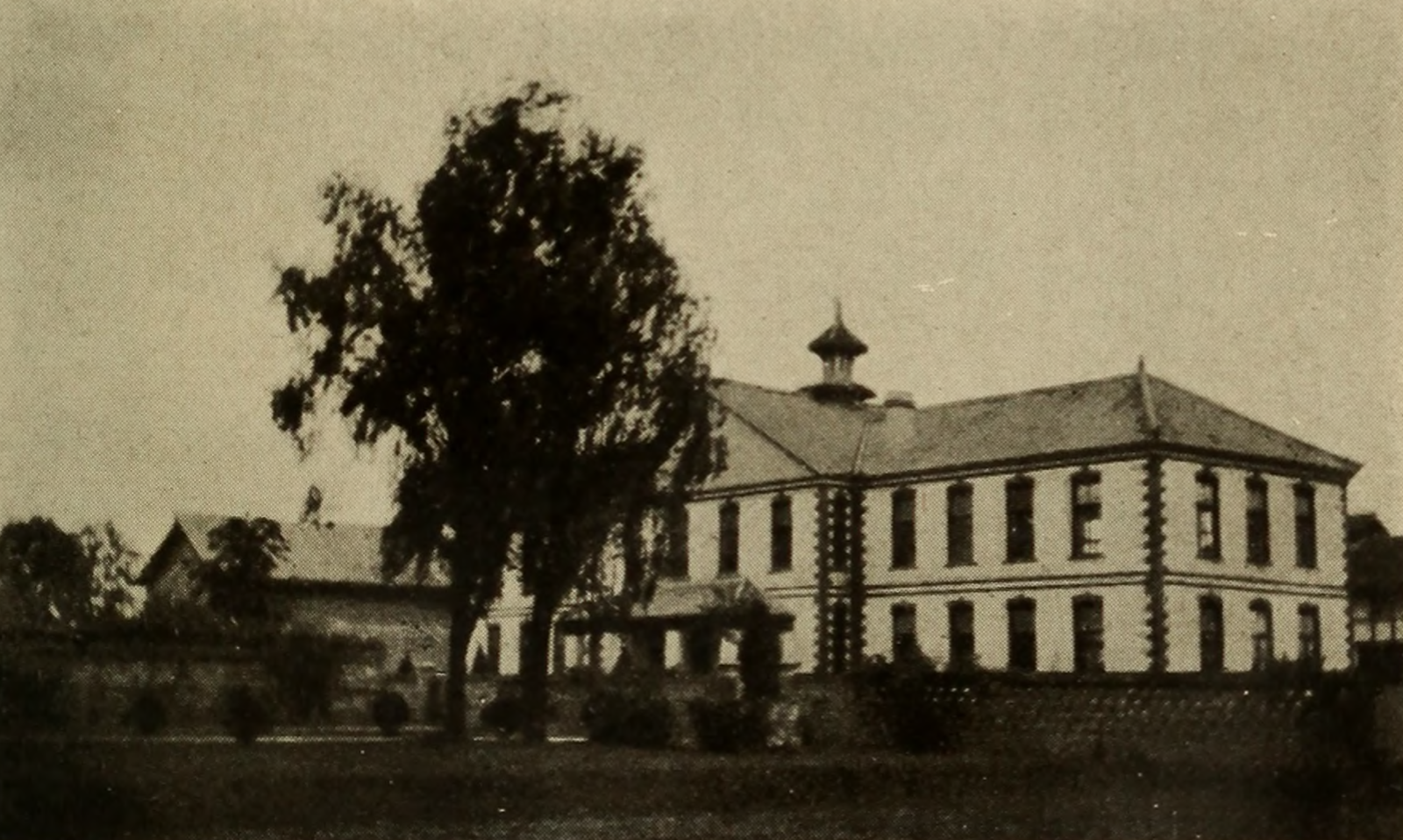
The first Canadian Methodist Mission Press at Jiading, before 1903

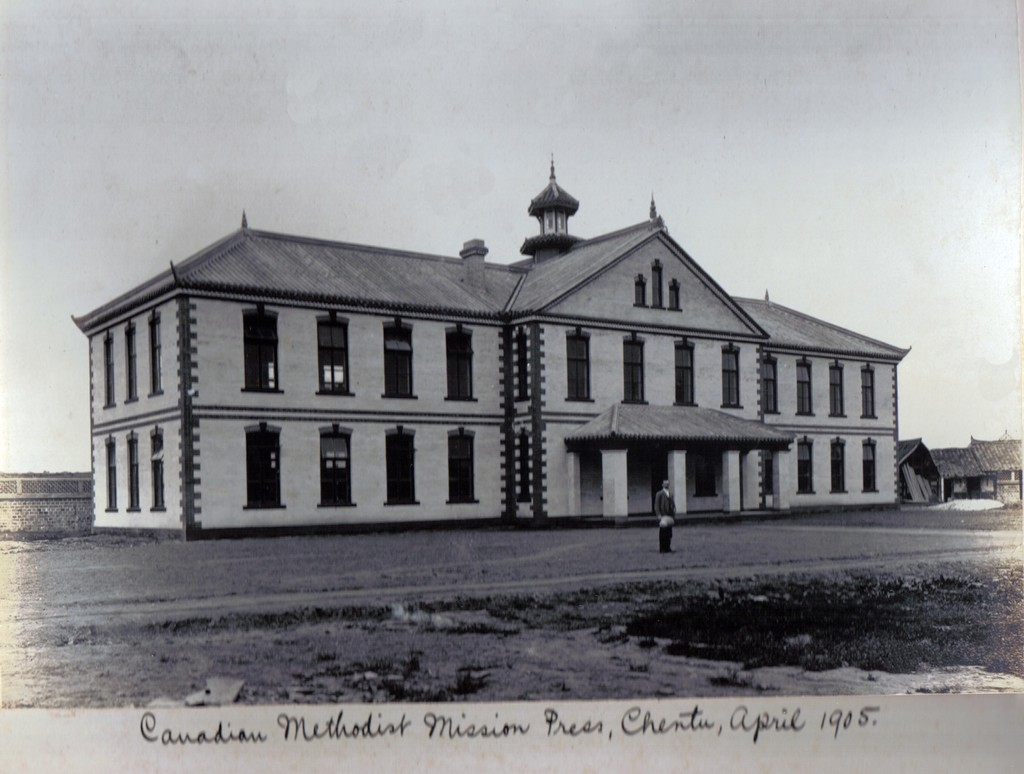
The new Canadian Methodist Mission Press at Chengdu, April 1905

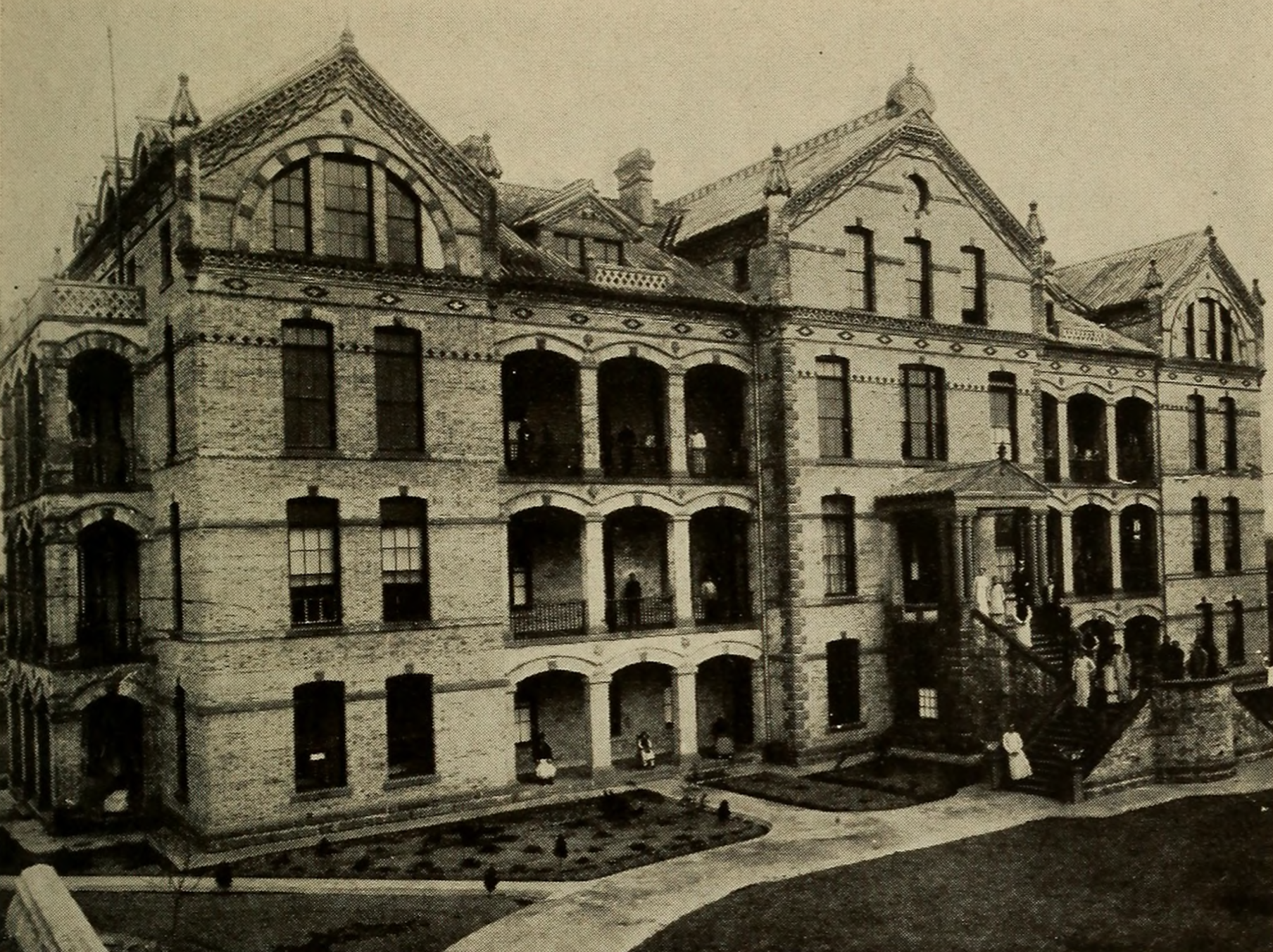
Canadian Methodist Hospital at Chengdu, before 1917

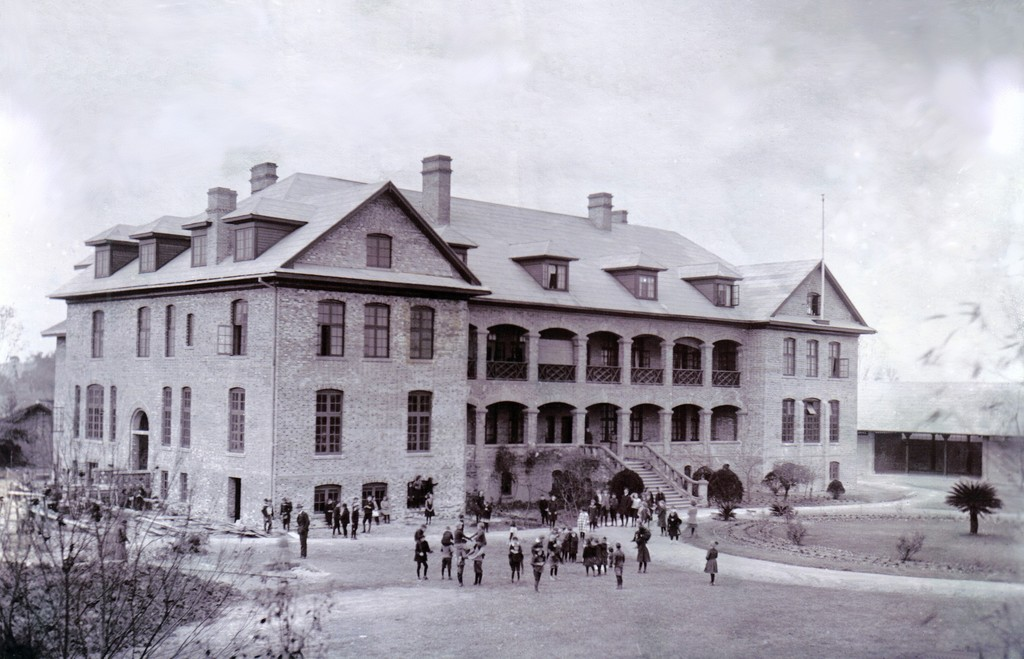
The Canadian School of the West China Union University, Chengdu, c. 1918

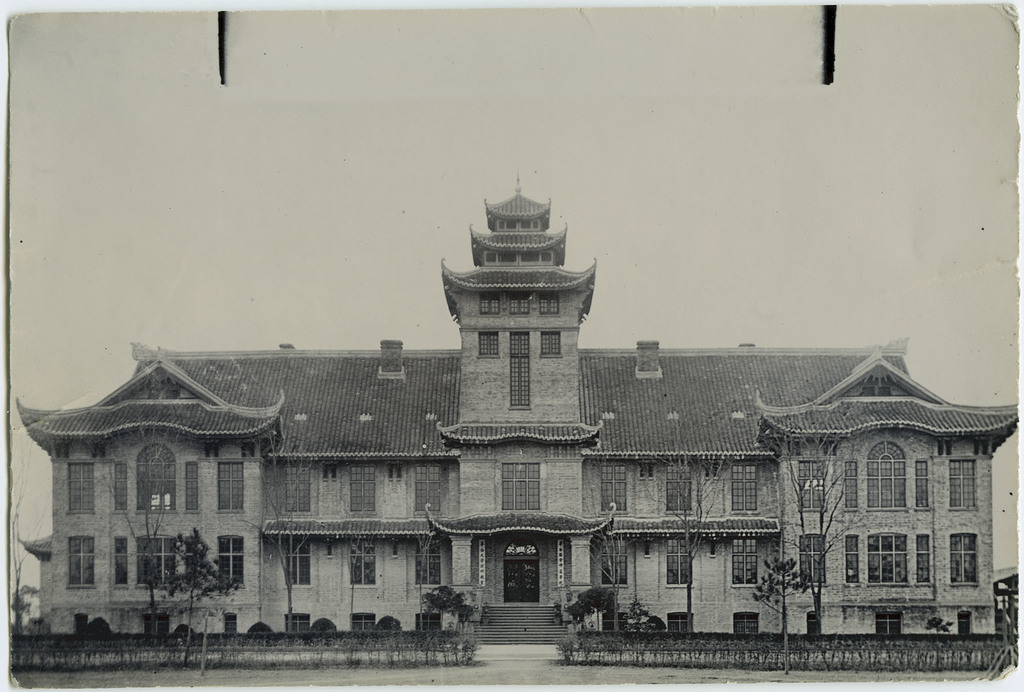
Canadian Methodists' Hart Memorial College at the West China Union University

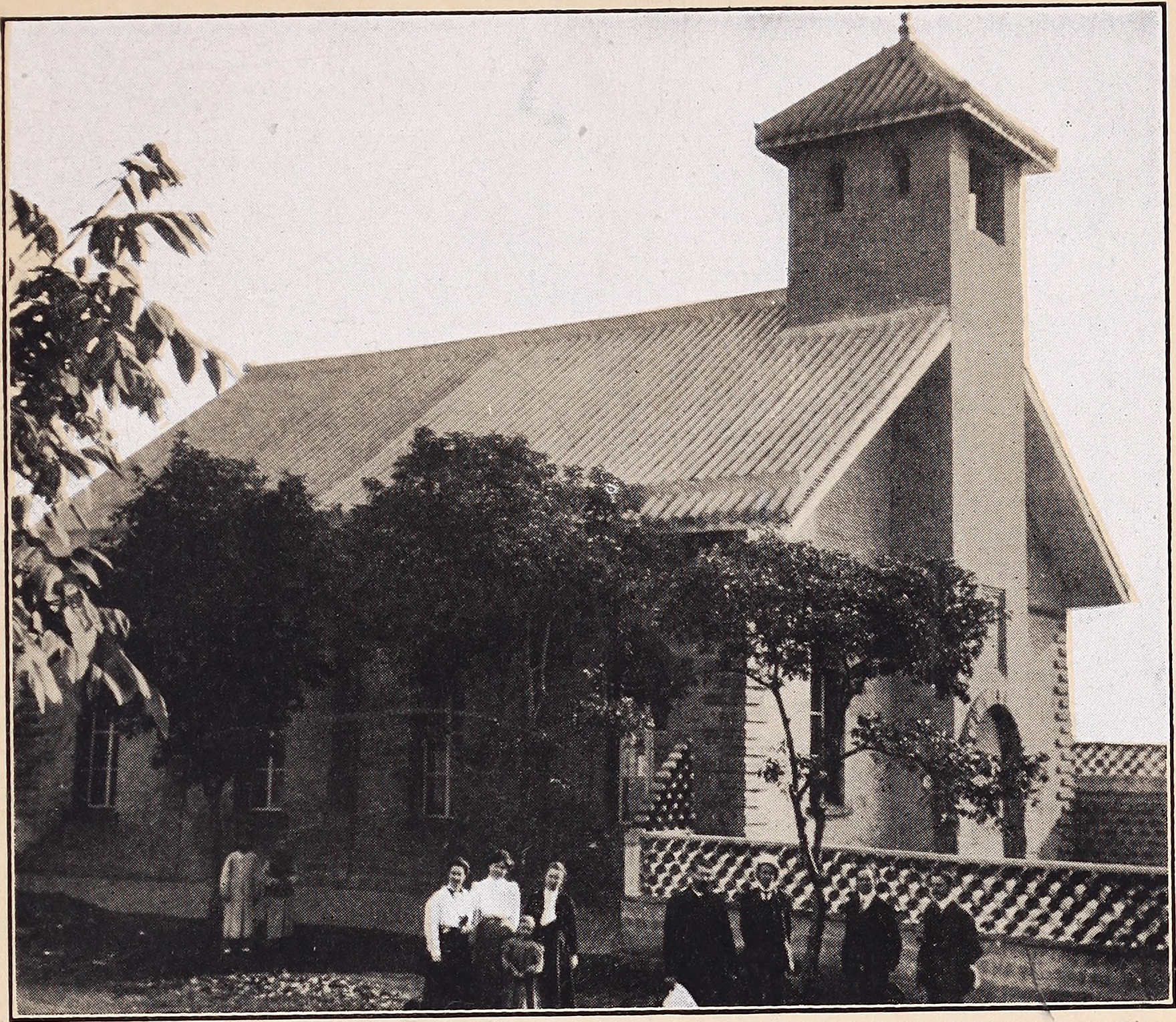
Canadian Methodist Church at Rongxian, before 1911

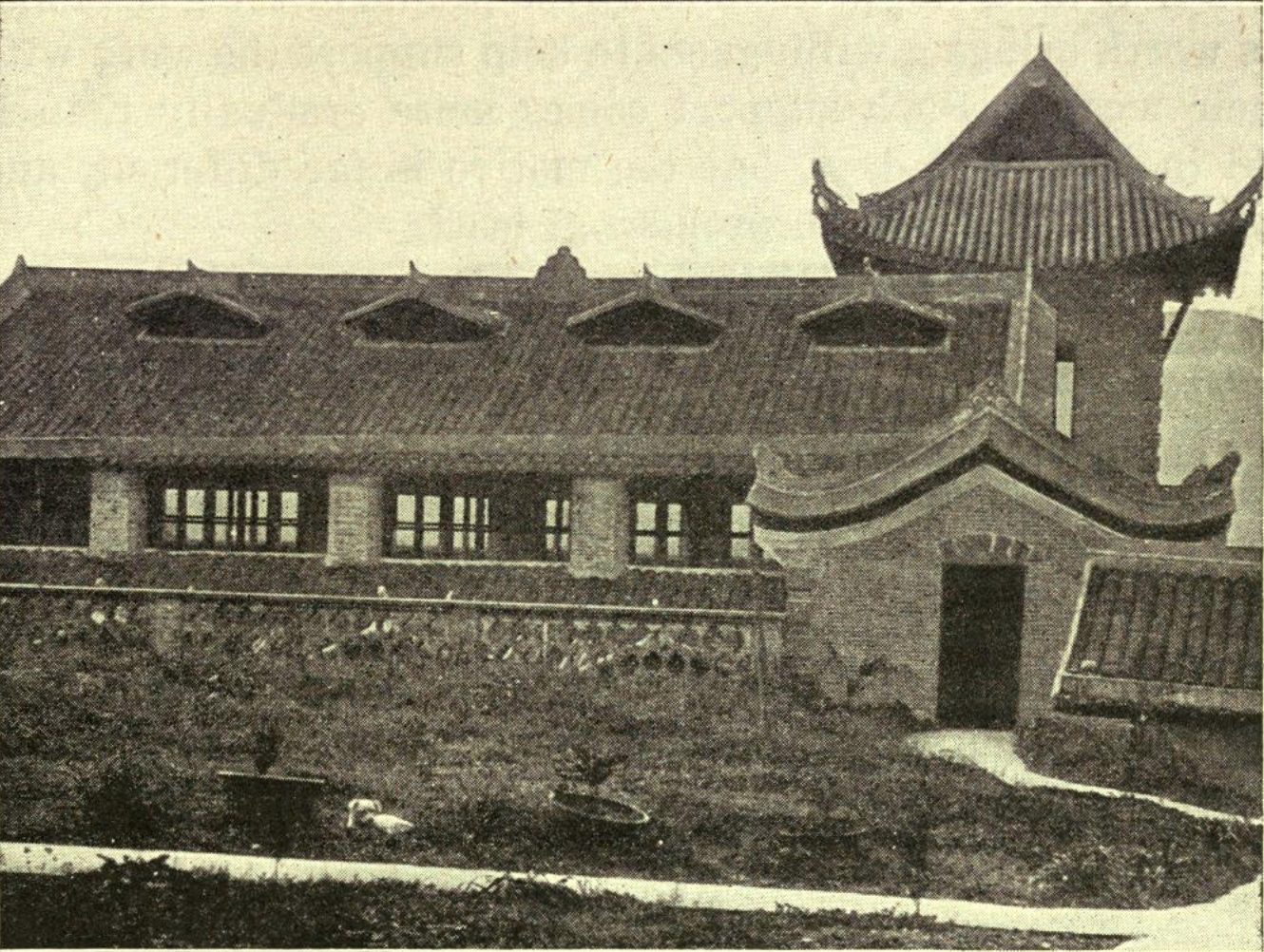
Canadian Methodist Church at Ziliujing, before 1920

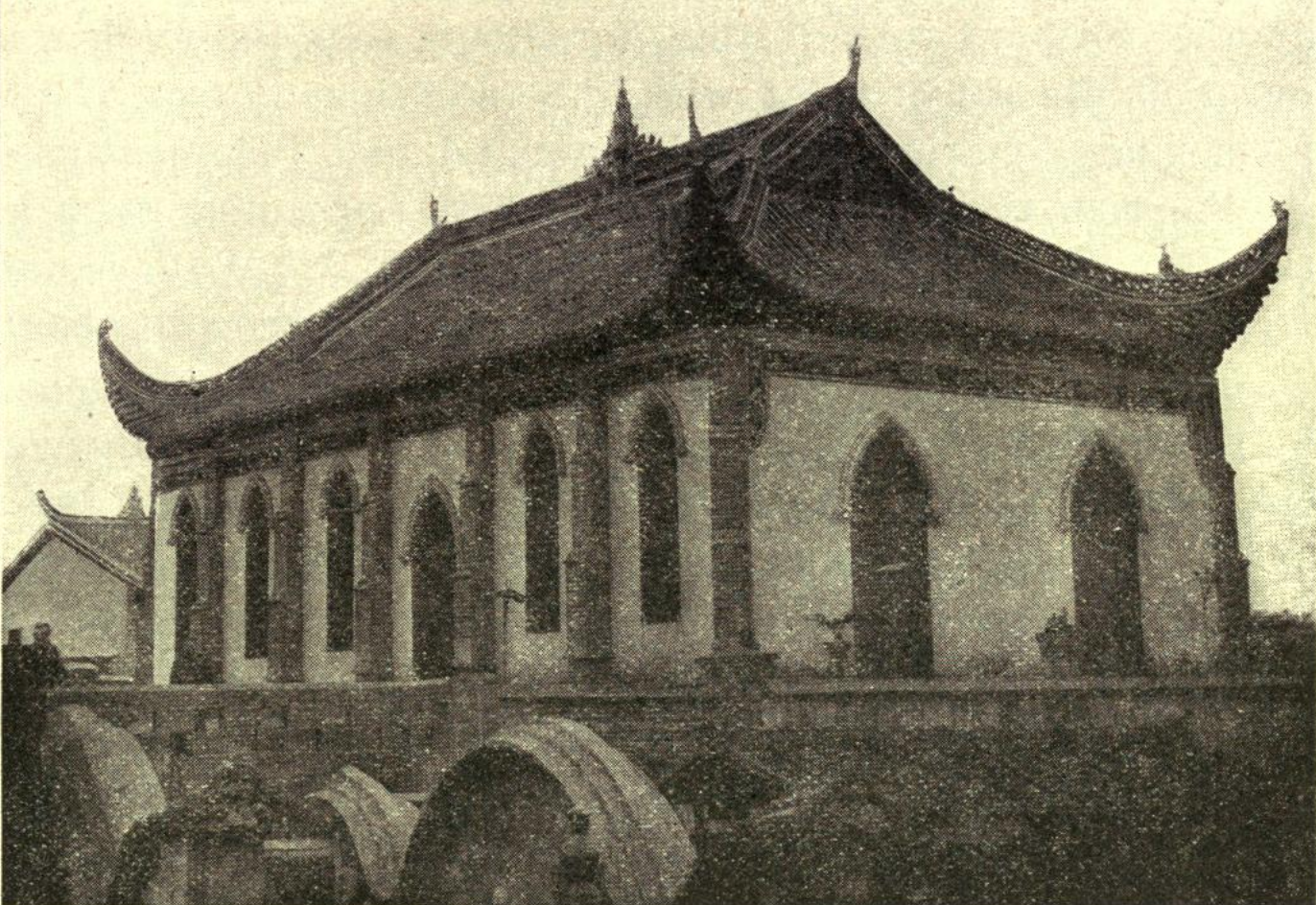
Canadian Methodist Church at Chongqing, before 1920

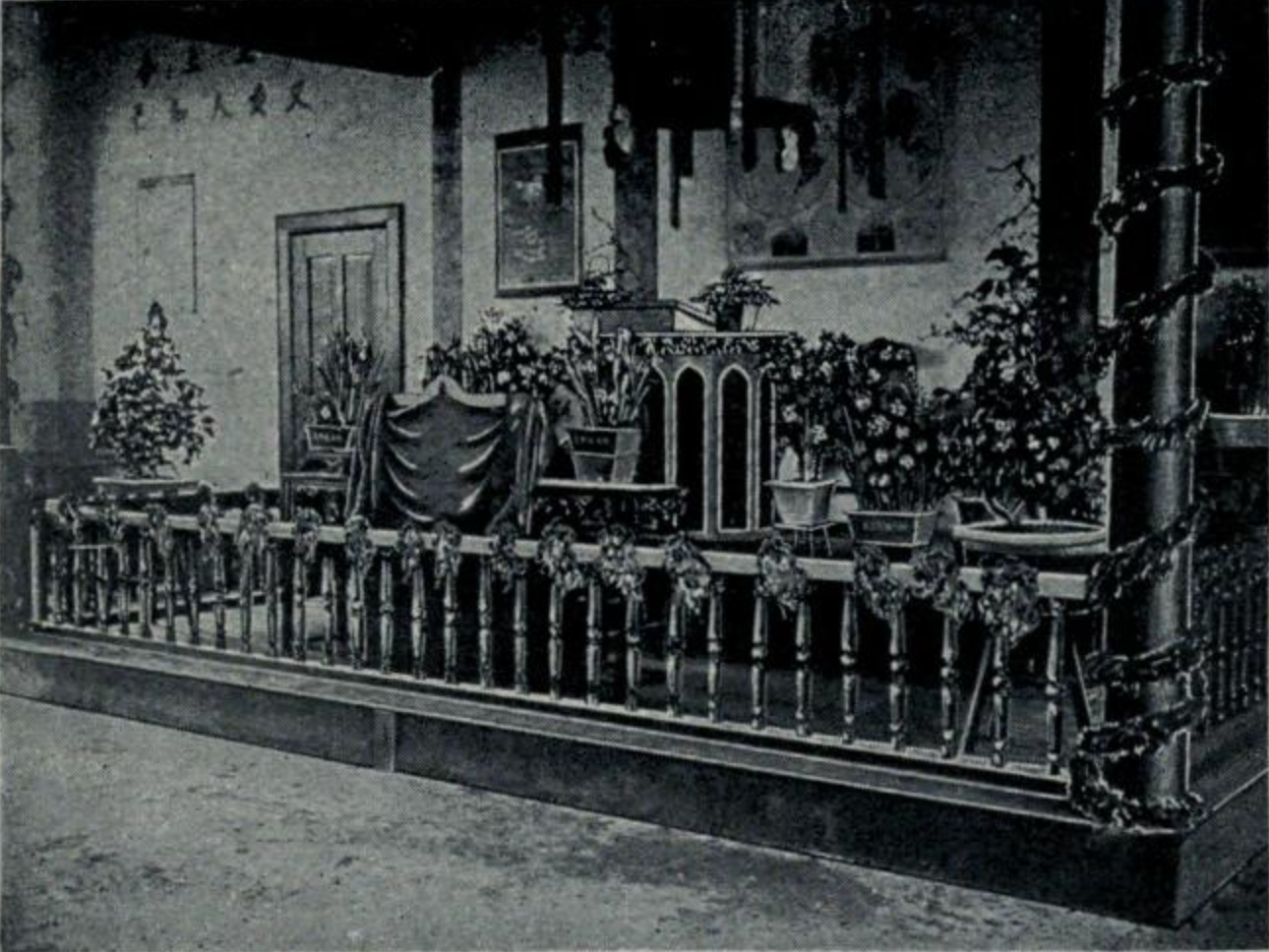
Interior of the Canadian Methodist Chapel at Chengdu, decorated for Christmas, before 1903

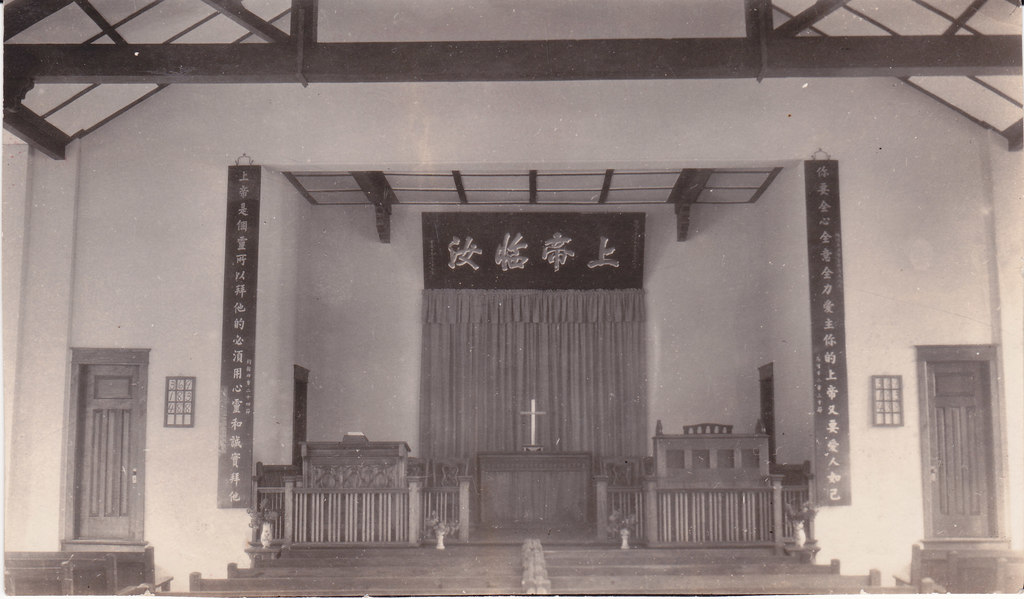
Chancel of the Canadian Methodist Mission Church at Luchow, 1932

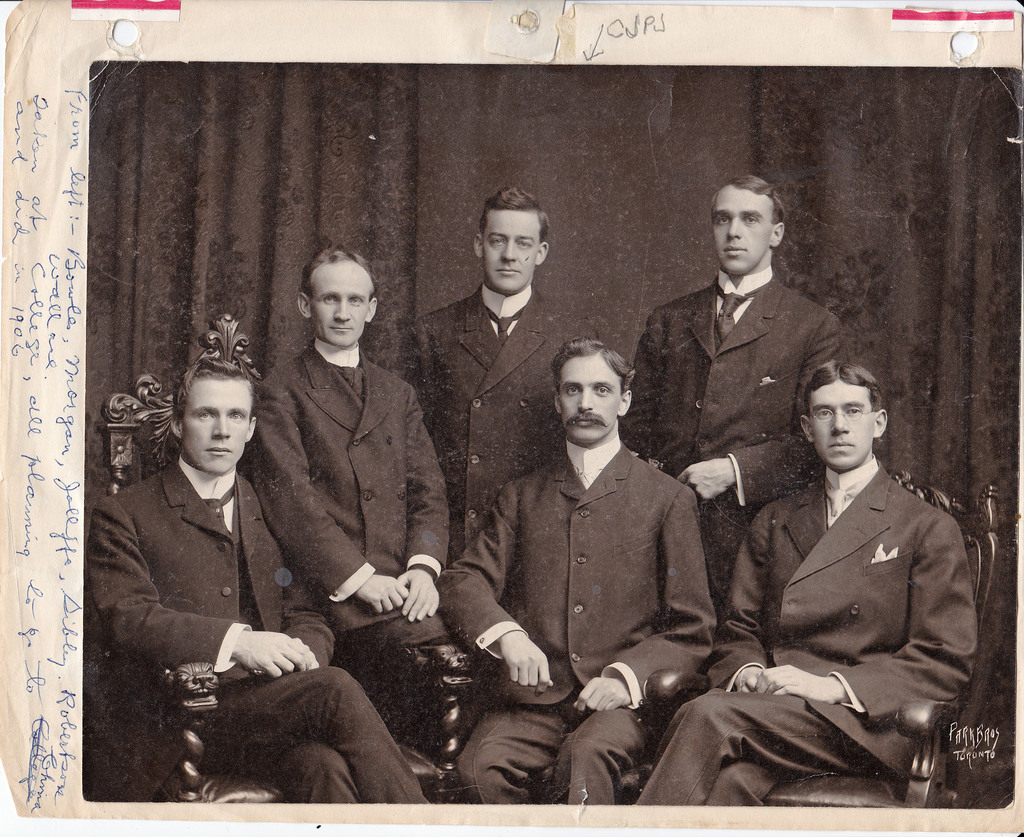
Six of the Victoria Eight, l to r: N. E. Bowles, E. W. Morgan, C. J. P. Jolliffe, W. E. Sibley, H. D. Robertson, and E. W. Wallace, sailed in 1906

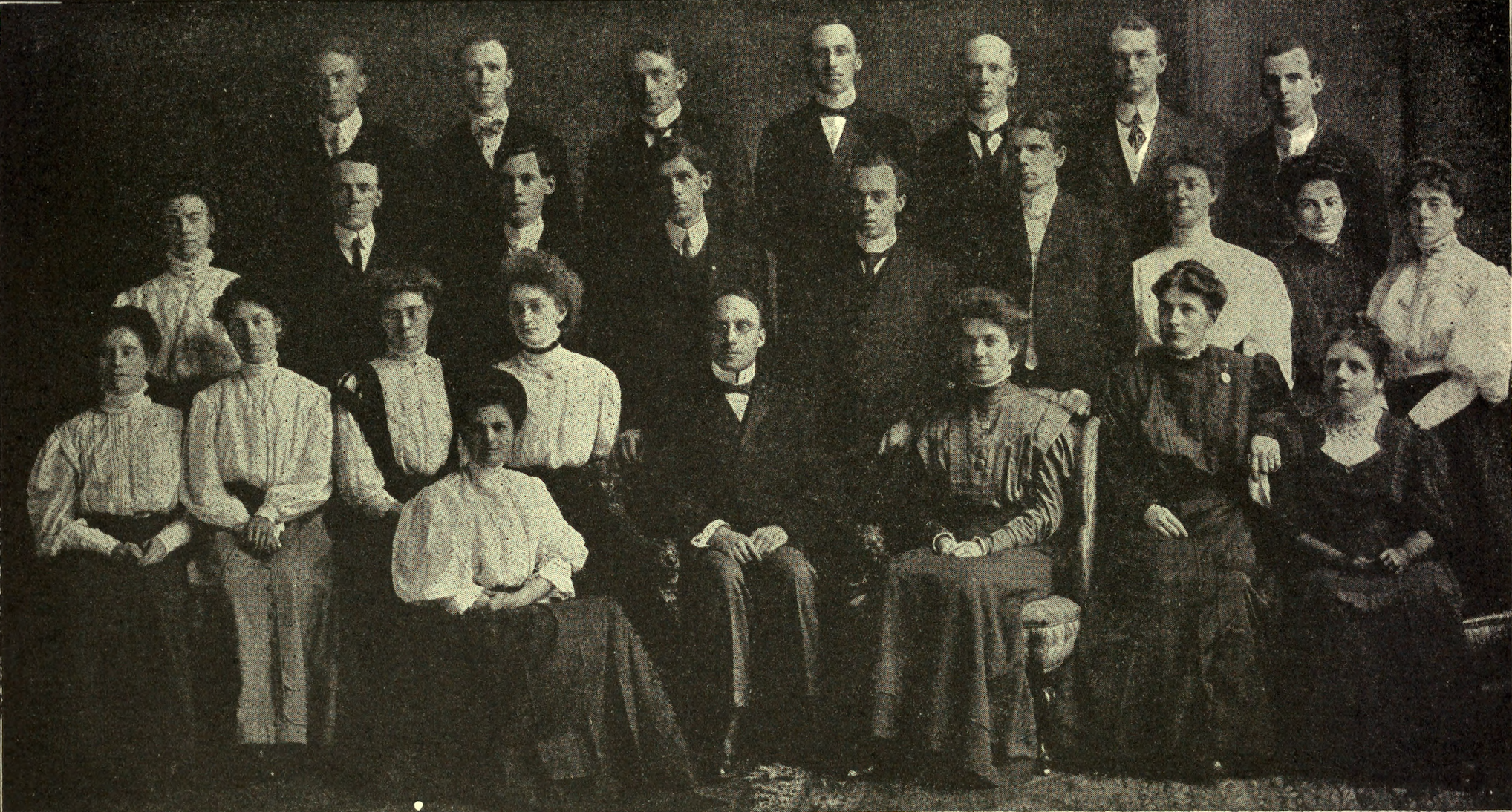
New mission group of the MCC, sailed in 1908

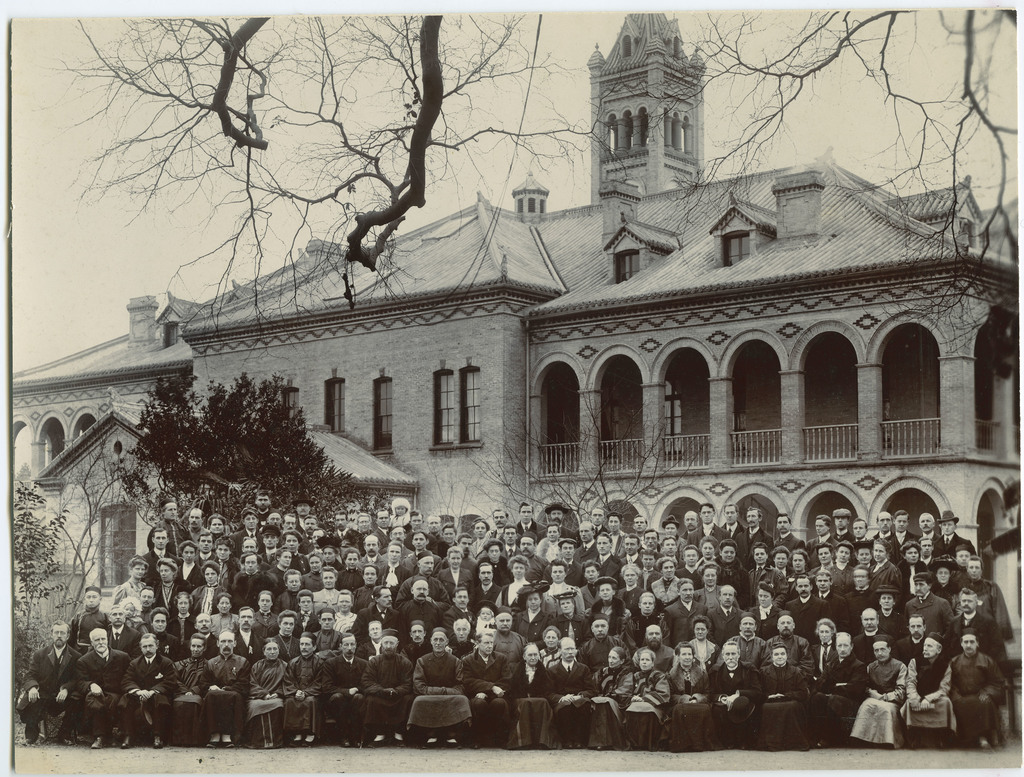
Forward Movement, Missionary Conference, Chengdu, 1908

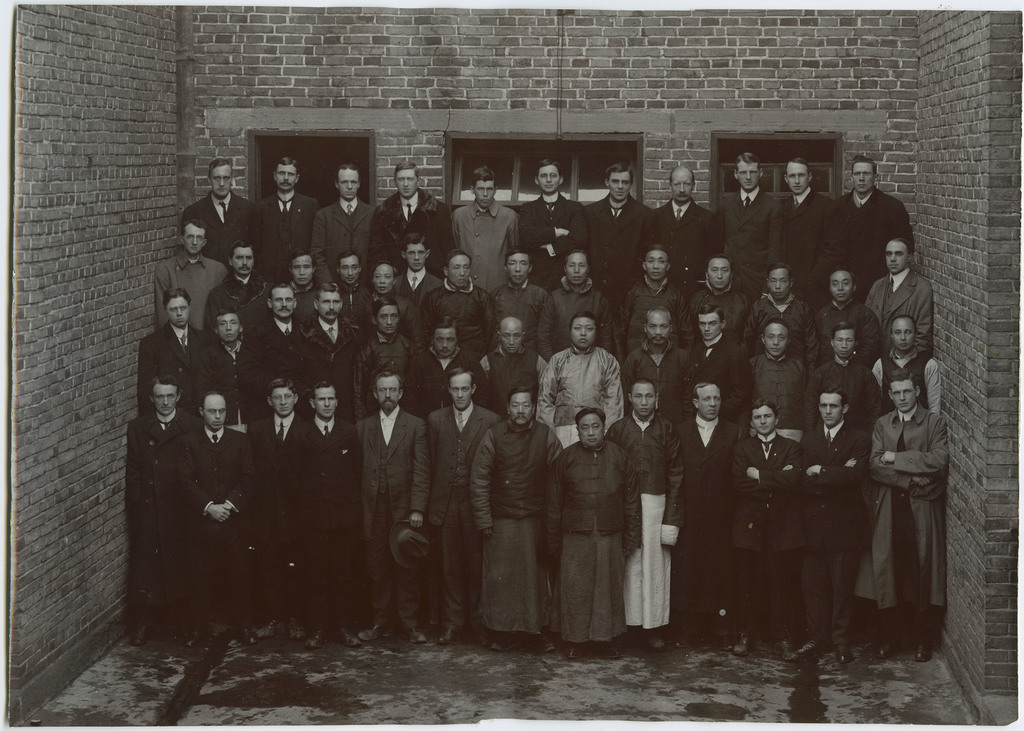
Canadian West China Mission Annual Conference, Chongqing, 1914

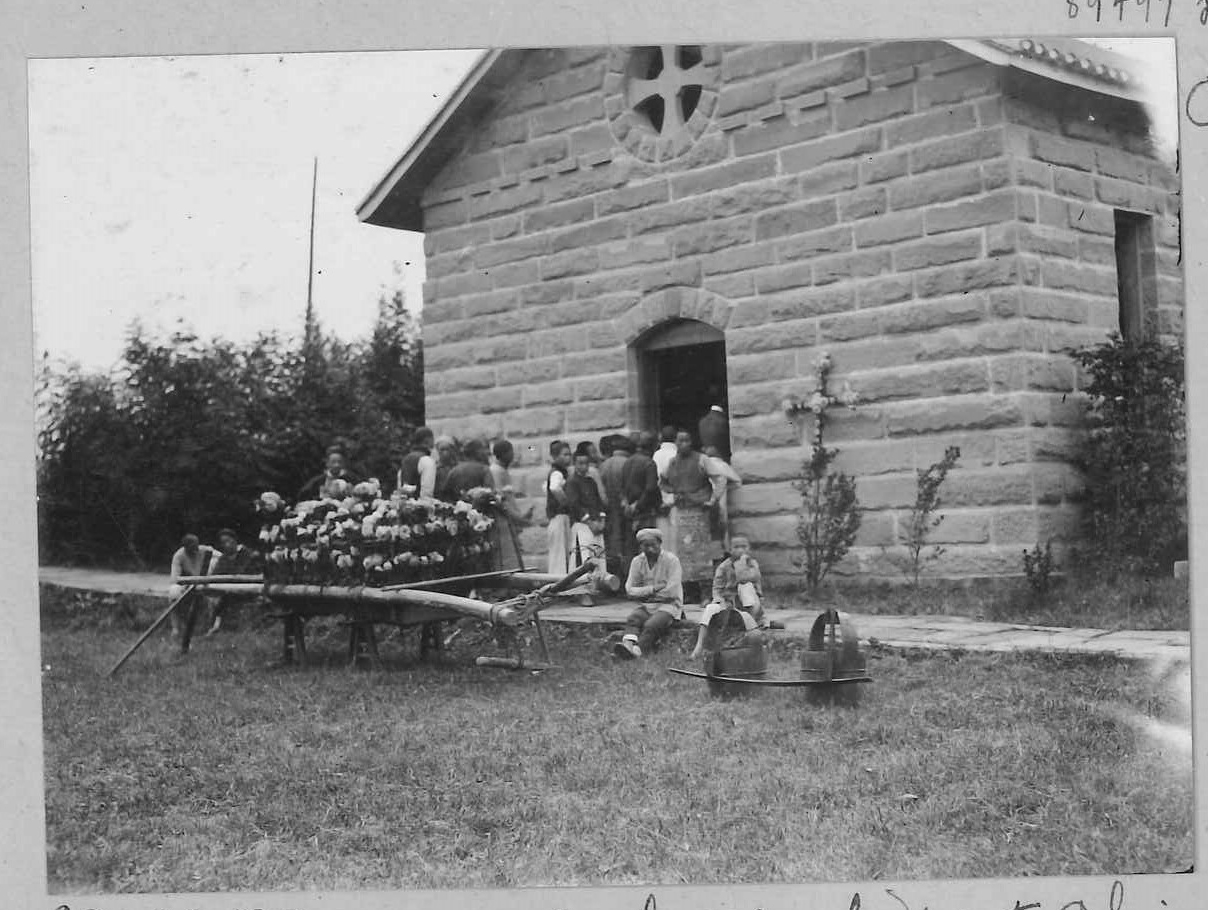
Funeral of one of the West China Conference pastors held at an American Methodist Episcopal church in Chongqing, between 1900 and 1930

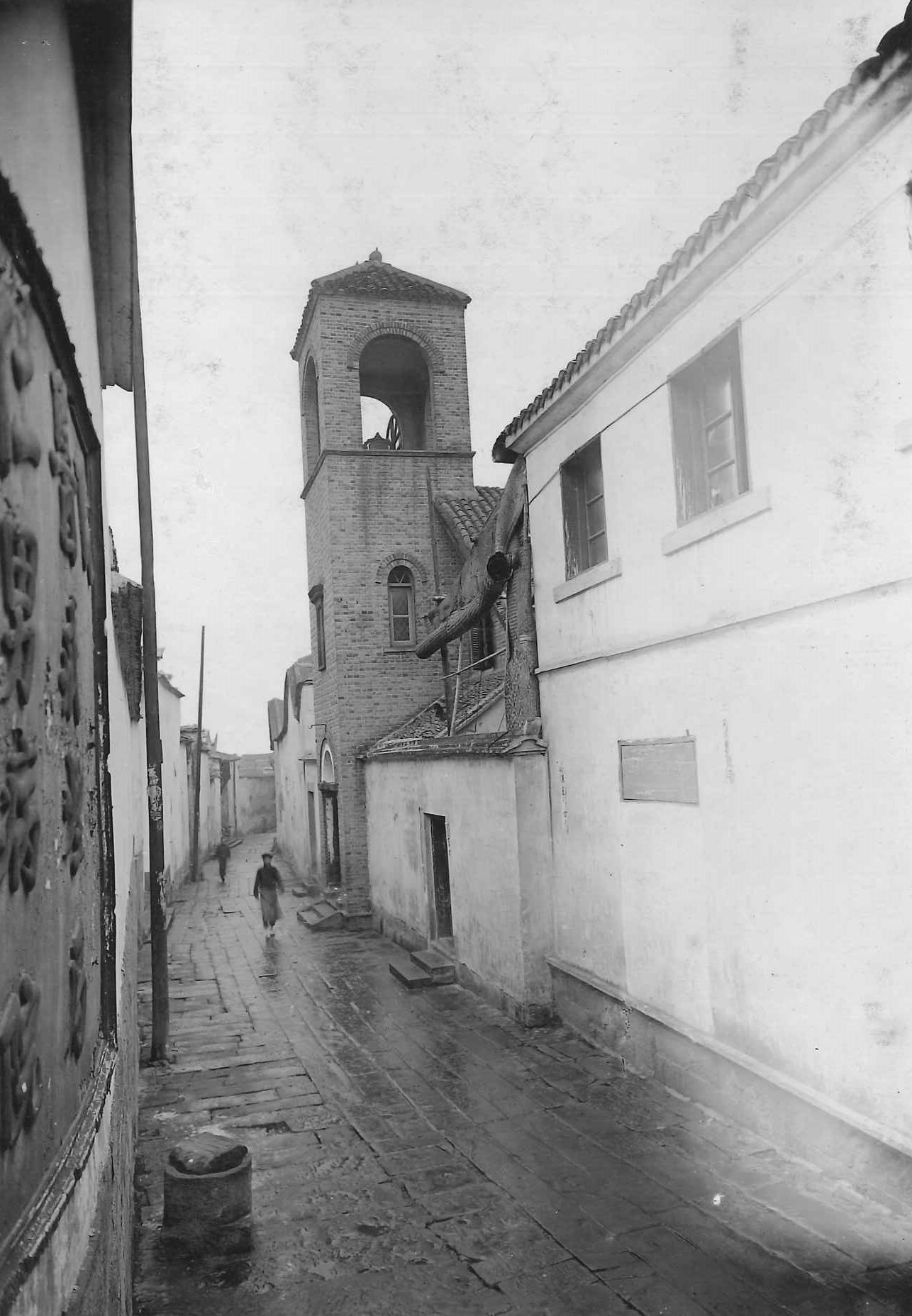
American Methodist Episcopal Church tower, Chongqing, between 1900 and 1930

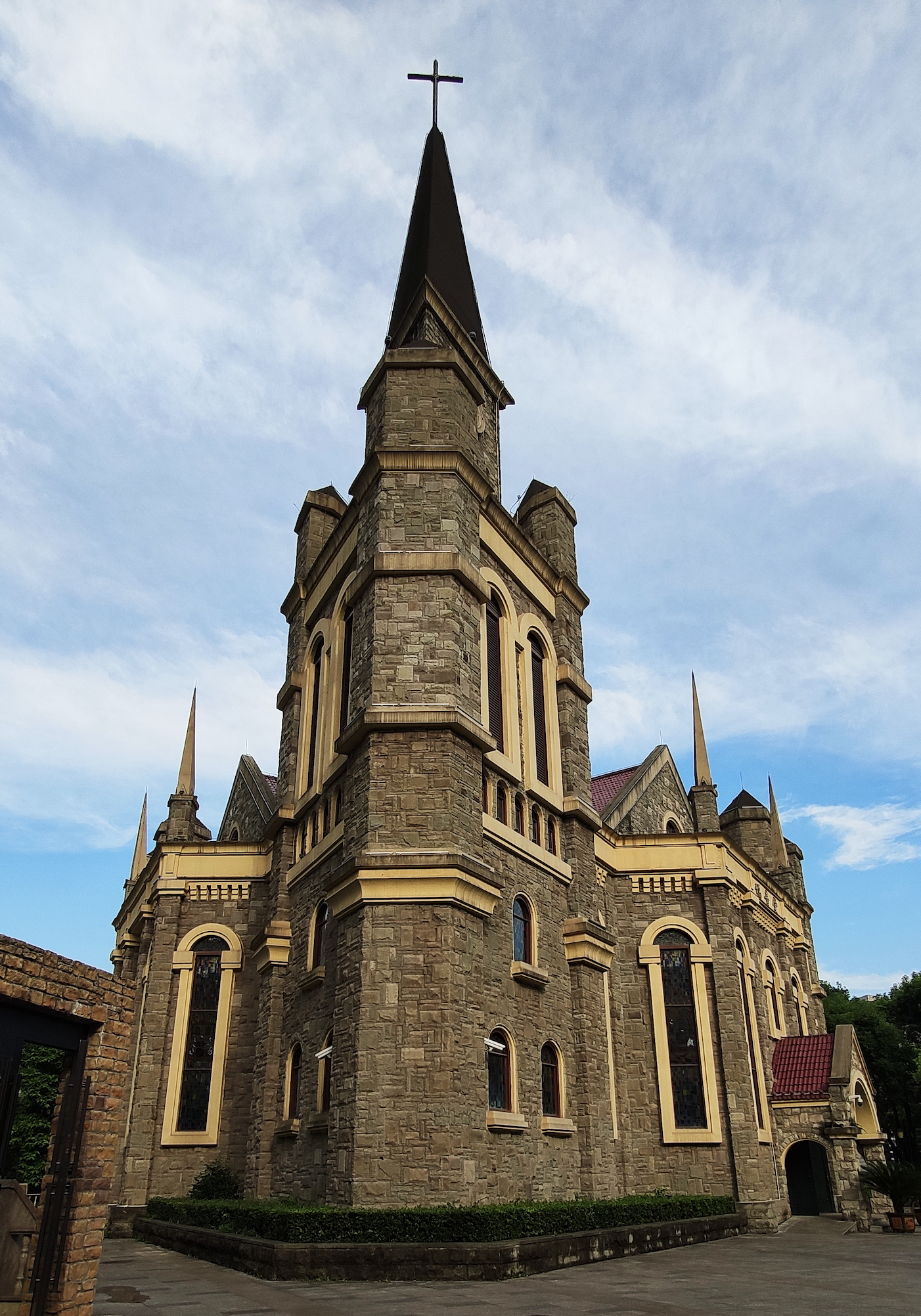
American Methodist Gospel Church at Chongqing in 2019

== See also ==
- Christianity in Sichuan
  - Church of the East in Sichuan
  - Catholic Church in Sichuan
  - Protestantism in Sichuan
    - Anglicanism in Sichuan
    - Quakerism in Sichuan
    - Baptist Christianity in Sichuan
    - Seventh-day Adventist Church in Sichuan
- Anti-Christian Movement (China)
- Anti-missionary riots in China
- Antireligious campaigns of the Chinese Communist Party
- Denunciation Movement
- House church (China)
- Category:Methodist missionaries in Sichuan
