= Joseph Beech =

American Methodist missionary and educator

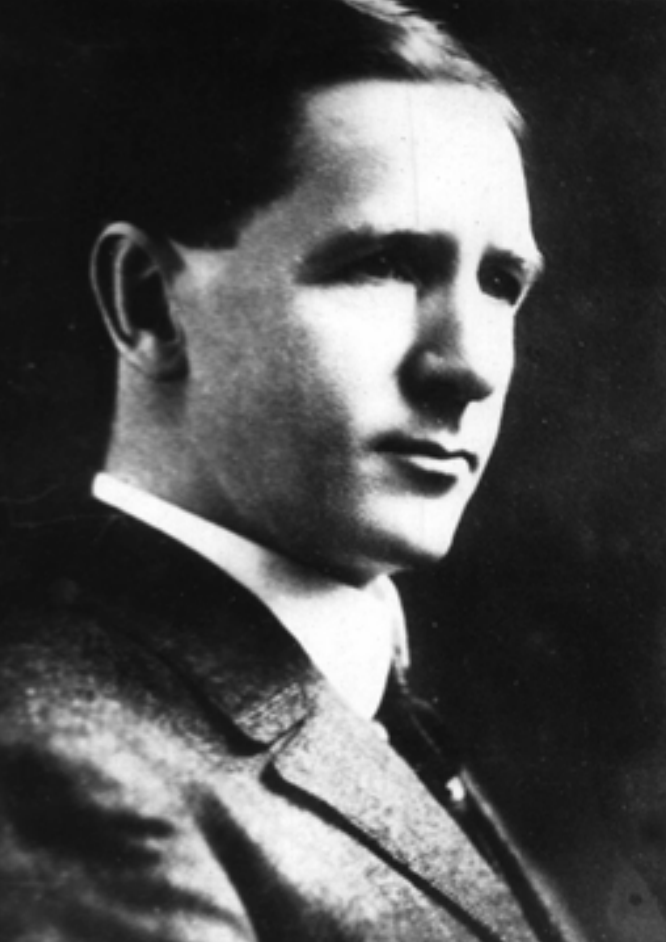

Personal life
- Born: October 3, 1867 Newbold, Derbyshire, England, United Kingdom
- Died: February 25, 1954 (aged 86) Chicago, Illinois, United States
- Spouse: Mary Josephine Harvey (m. 1888; died 1890) Nellie Miriam Decker (m. 1904)
- Education: Centenary Collegiate Institute; Wesleyan University
- Other name: Joe Beech
- Occupation: Missionary, educator

Religious life
- Religion: Methodism
- Denomination: Methodist Episcopal Church
- Founder of: West China Union University

Senior posting
- Awards: Order of Brilliant Jade

Joseph Beech, or Joe Beech as he was more commonly known (October 3, 1867 – February 25, 1954), was an American Methodist missionary and educator, member of Psi Upsilon and Phi Beta Kappa, and founding president of the West China Union University. He was a recipient of the Order of Brilliant Jade.

== Life and career ==
Beech was born October 3, 1867, in Newbold, Derbyshire, England. He attended Centenary Collegiate Institute in Hackettstown, New Jersey before entering Wesleyan University, Middletown, Connecticut, where he graduated in 1899 with a Bachelor's degree in Philosophy. While in college he was class president in his junior year and president of the YMCA.

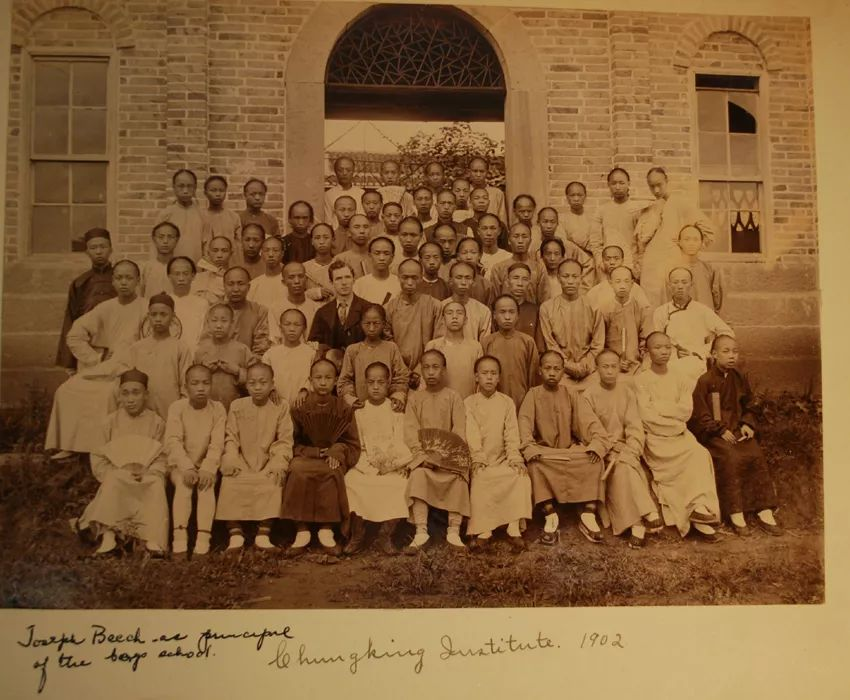
Joseph Beech as the principal of Chungking Wesleyan Mission School (also known as Chungking Institute), 1902.

After his graduation from Wesleyan, Beech went to Sichuan (Szechwan), western China as a missionary through the Board of Foreign Missions of the Methodist Episcopal Church. He first spent time in Chongqing (Chungking) as the principal of the Chungking Wesleyan Mission School from 1901 to 1904. He moved to the provincial capital Chengdu (Chengtu) in 1905, where he served as the founding president of West China Union University. This university was founded in 1910 by four Protestant mission societies of three nations, namely, the American Baptist Foreign Mission Society (American Baptist Churches USA), American Methodist Episcopal Mission (Methodist Episcopal Church), Canadian Methodist Mission (Methodist Church of Canada), and Friends' Foreign Mission Association (British Quakers).

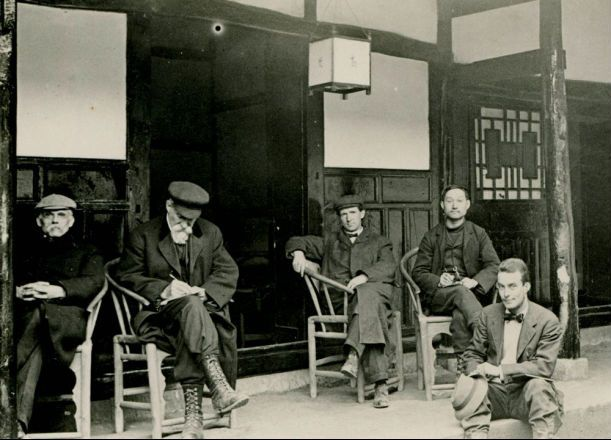
From left to right, E. D. Burton, T. C. Chamberlin, Joseph Beech, Y. T. Wang (interpreter), and R. T. Chamberlin (T. C. Chamberlin's son) at Santai County, Sichuan, during an exploratory trip through China in 1909 as part of the Oriental Educational Investigation Commission.

Creating a university requires lengthy preparation, which started in 1905 with a Temporary Board of Management of the West China Union University founded to handle this task. Beech was appointed a member of this Board together with Dr. Canright, C. R. Carscallen, E. J. Carson, H. T. Hodgkin, H. D. Robertson, H. T. Silcock, J. Taylor, E. Williams, and J. W. Yost. The Board prepared a report for presentation to the University of Chicago commissioners, Ernest DeWitt Burton and Thomas Chrowder Chamberlin, on the occasion of their visit to West China in May 1909, as part of the Oriental Investigation Commission project supported by John D. Rockefeller to reconnoiter the Eastern world as a potential site for the humanitarian projects of the nascent Rockefeller Foundation.

In the process of preparation, Beech reached out to Wesleyan students, faculty, and alumni. Through his fundraising efforts, the Wesleyan community's financial support of West China Union University helped it to thrive. In addition to serving as founding president, Beech designed many of the university's buildings and was himself a member of its teaching faculty. In "History of the Union University: A Sketch", H. D. Robertson, a Canadian Methodist missionary, described Beech as someone "smiling his way through all sorts of difficulties and bringing to definite conclusions all manner of suggestions and ideas. In Western countries we see him going from place to place telling the tale of this university and its opportunities, and interesting men so that they give with confidence the money needed for the University."

Beech served as the Union University's chancellor from 1931 to 1940 before retiring to the United States. He died in 1954 in Chicago. His contribution to the higher education of Republican China won the recognition of the Government. Upon his departure for the States in 1940, he was given a special farewell by Generalissimo Chiang Kai-shek and awarded the Diploma of the First Class and the Order of Brilliant Jade.

== Personal life ==
Beech married Mary Josephine Harvey in 1888, who died just two years later (1890). They had one son named Elliot. In 1904, he married Nellie Miriam Decker in Chongqing. They had six children, three boys and three girls.

== See also ==
- Omar Leslie Kilborn
- Methodism in Sichuan
- The West China Missionary News
- Journal of the West China Border Research Society
