= American Methodist Episcopal Mission =

Organization

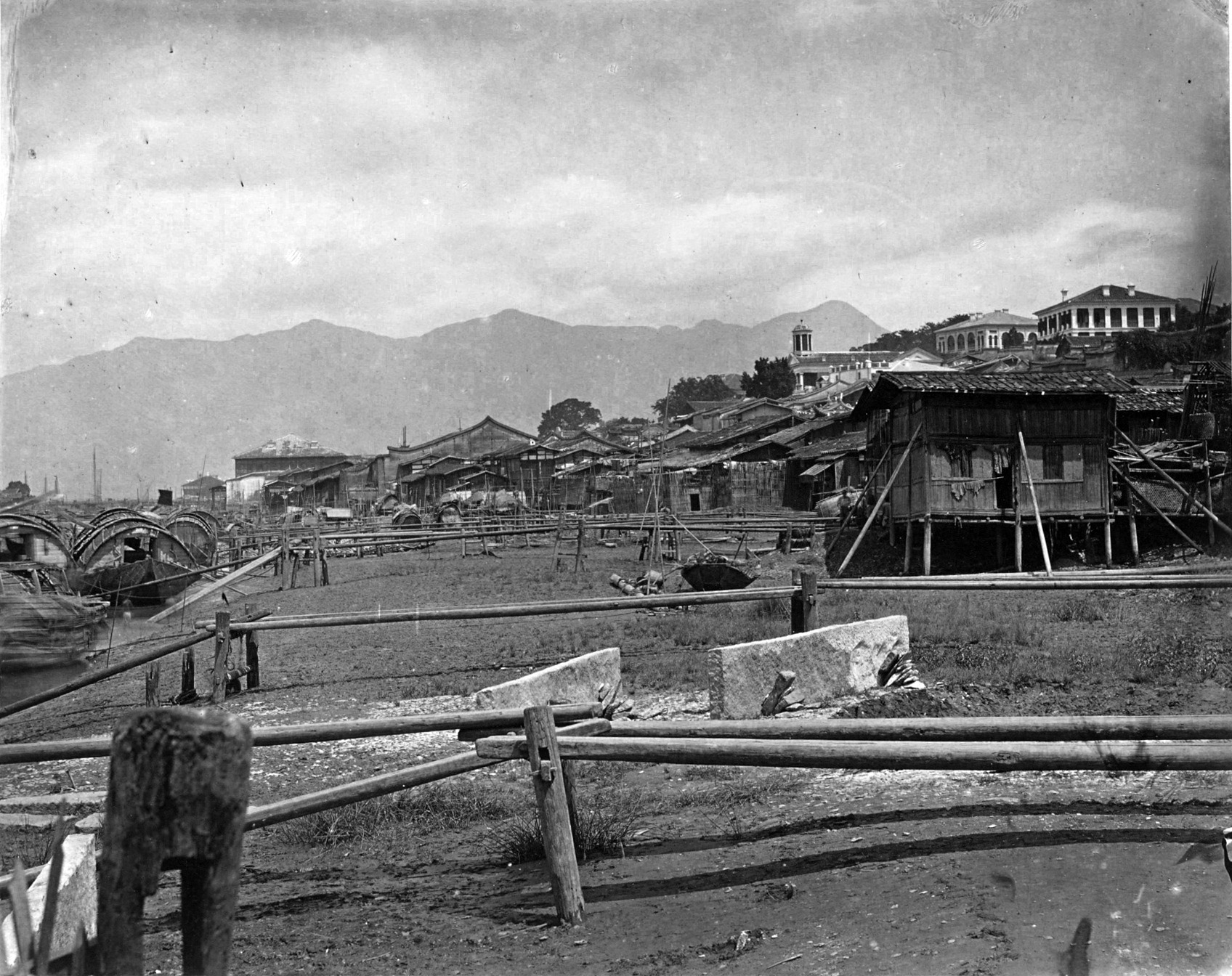
Church and Houses of Methodist Episcopal Mission (between 1860 and 1880)

American Methodist Episcopal Mission (AMEM; also known as Board of Foreign Missions of the Methodist Episcopal Church [MEFB]) was the missionary society of the Methodist Episcopal Church that was involved in sending workers to countries such as Africa, South America, India, Australia and China during the late Qing dynasty.

== Mission in China ==
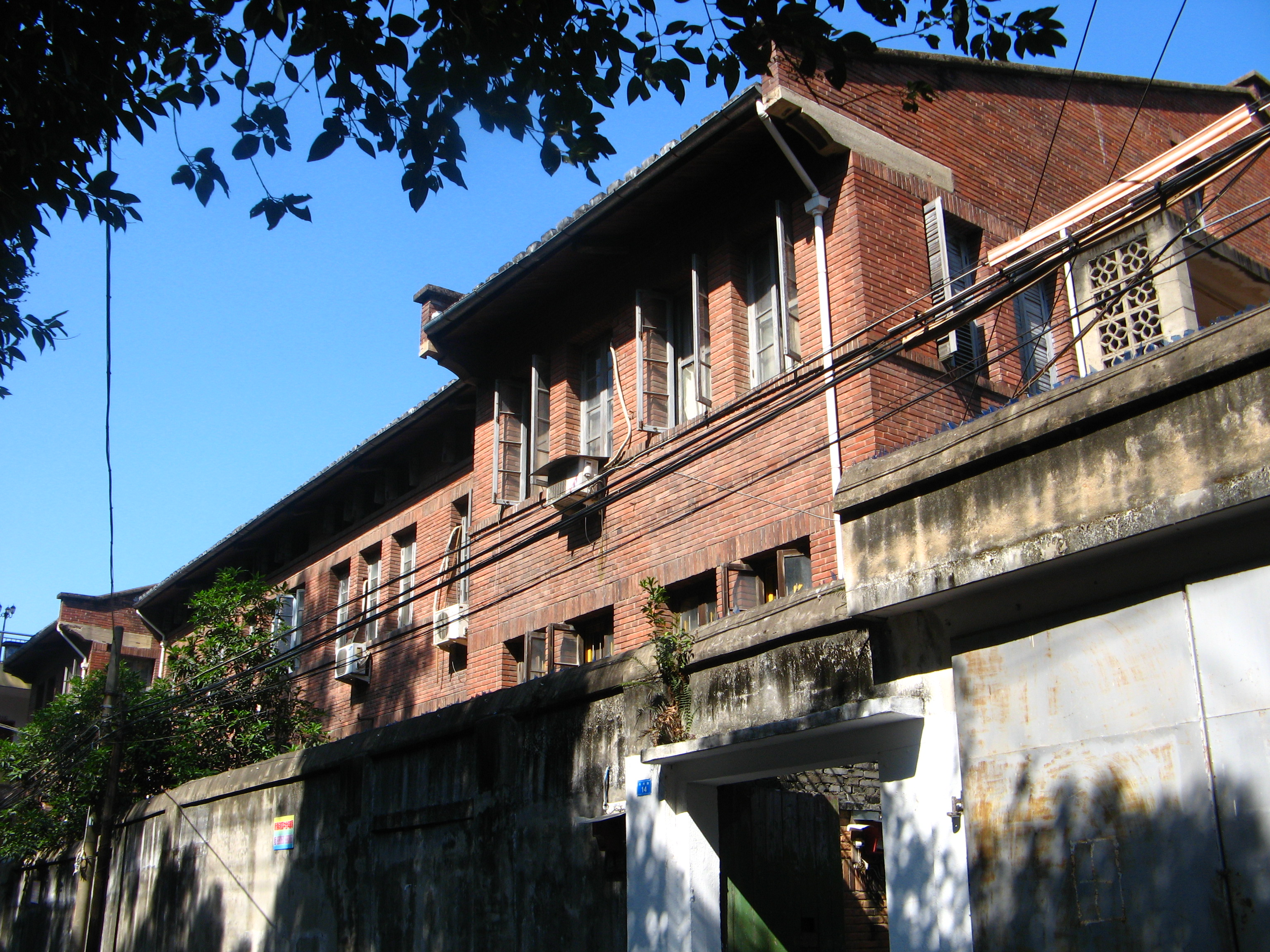
Former AMEM center in Fuzhou

In 1847, the American Methodist Episcopal Society (North) entered the field of China, and soon surpassed all others in the number of its agents and members. Its pioneer was Rev. Judson Dwight Collins, who passionately asked the society to enter China. When he was told that no money was available for the purpose, he wrote:

Engage me a passage before the mast in the first vessel going to China. My own strong arm can pull me to China and can support me when I arrive there.

Such enthusiasm was irresistible, and Collins was sent to Fuzhou, where, after ten years weary preparation, a work broke out, which spread itself over six large districts, and comprised sixty stations. A printing press was kept busily employed, which, in the year 1888 alone, issued 14,000 pages of Christian literature. A large college was in use through the generosity of a natives. The mission also wound along the banks of the Yangtze for three hundred miles, and had stations in Jiujiang and other large cities. Northwards it had churches in Beijing, Tianjin and Zunhua, with full accompaniments of schools and hospitals, and extended westward to Chongqing, 1,400 miles from the sea. In 1890 it had thirty-two missionaries, seventeen lady agents, forty-three native ordained pastors, ninety-one unordained native helpers, and over four thousand communicants.

== See also ==
- American Methodist Episcopal Mission in Sichuan
- Canadian Methodist Mission
- Christianity in China
- List of Protestant missionaries in China
- List of Protestant missionary societies in China (1807–1953)
- Protestant missions in China 1807–1953
- Timeline of Chinese history
- William Taylor (missionary) — Established many Methodist self supporting missions in Africa and South America in the 1800s
