= Zizhong County =

Zizhong County 资中县
- County
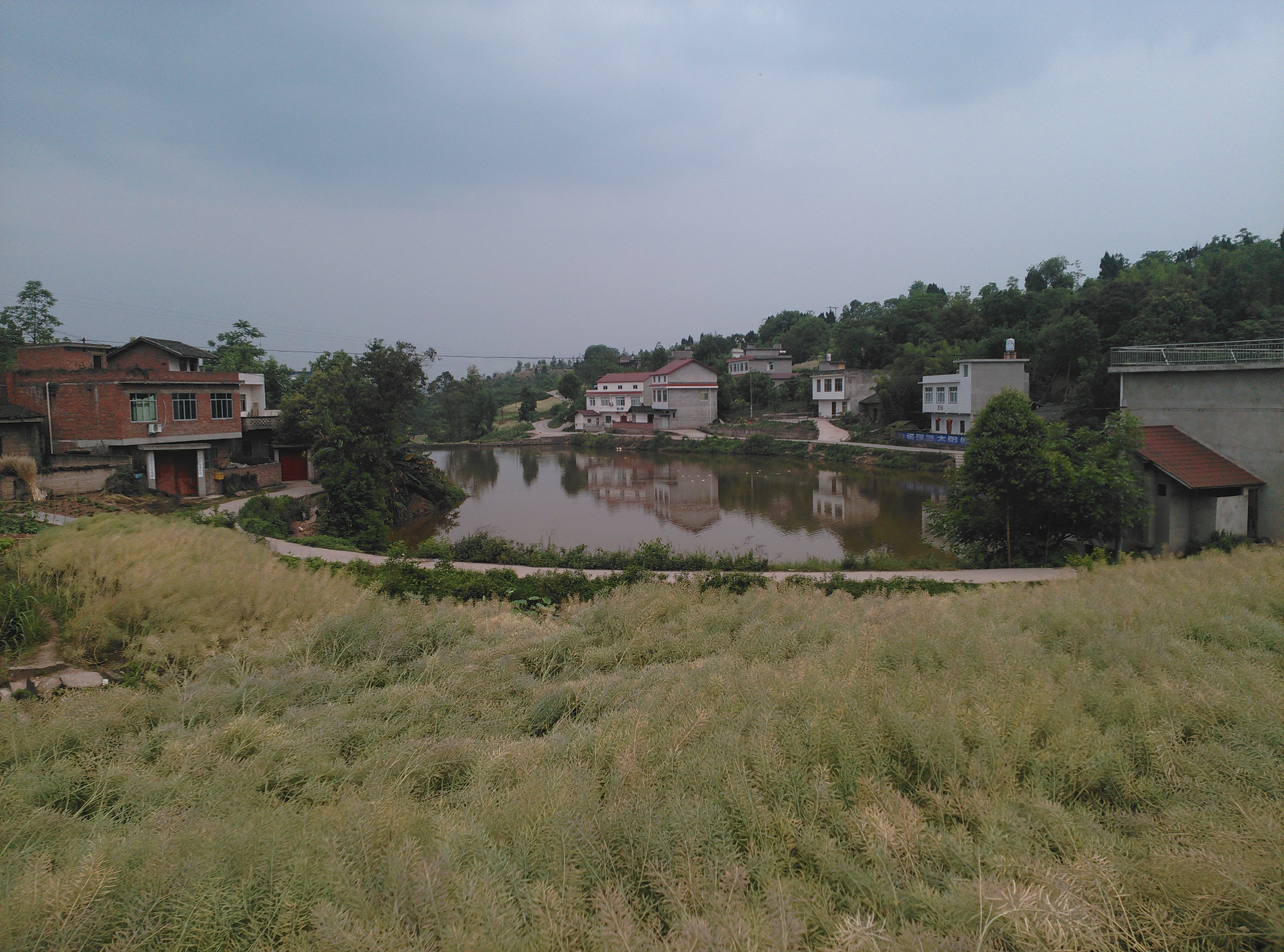

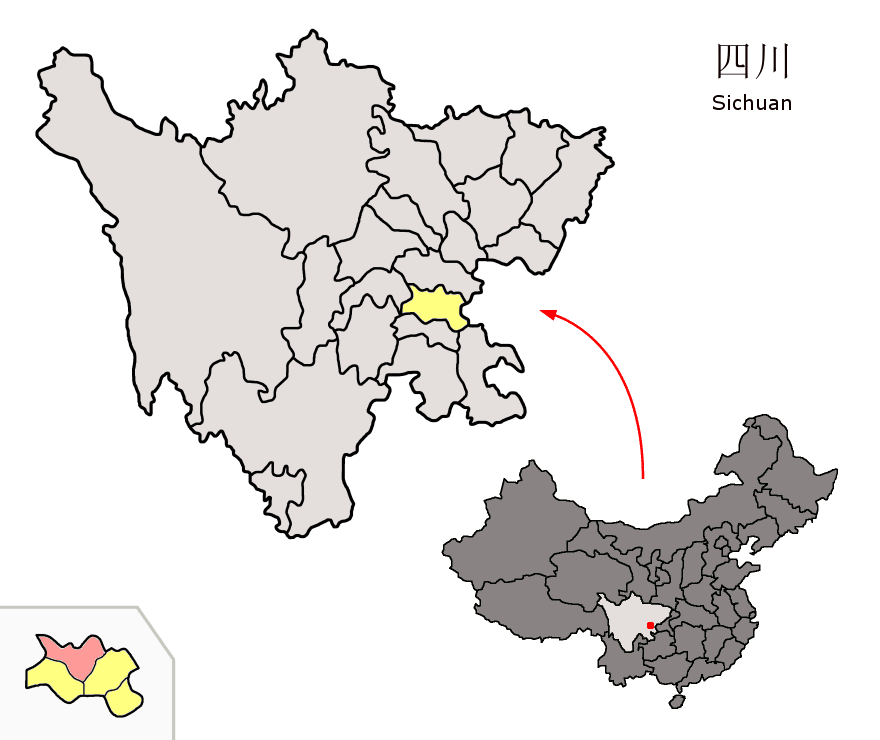
- Location of Zizhong County (red) within Neijiang City (yellow) and Sichuan
- Country: China
- Province: Sichuan
- Prefecture-level city: Neijiang
- County seat: Shuinan

Area
  - Total: 1,734 km^{2} (670 sq mi)

Population (2020 census)
  - Total: 845,579
  - Density: 487.6/km^{2} (1,263/sq mi)
- Time zone: UTC+8 (China Standard)

Zizhong County
- Traditional Chinese: 資中縣
- Simplified Chinese: 资中县
Transcriptions
Standard Mandarin
- Hanyu Pinyin: Zīzhōng Xiàn

Zizhong County is a county of Sichuan Province, China. It is under the administration of Neijiang city.

== History ==
During the imperial era, the area of Zizhong County was part of Zi Prefecture.

== Administrative divisions ==
Zizhong County comprises 22 towns:

- Chonglong 重龙镇
- Guide 归德镇
- Yuxi 鱼溪镇
- Tiefo 铁佛镇
- Qiuxi 球溪镇
- Longjie 龙结镇
- Luoquan 罗泉镇
- Falun 发轮镇
- Yinshan 银山镇
- Taiping 太平镇
- Shuinan 水南镇
- Xinqiao 新桥镇
- Mingxinsi 明心寺镇
- Shuanghe 双河镇
- Gongmin 公民镇
- Longjiang 龙江镇
- Shuanglong 双龙镇
- Gaolou 高楼镇
- Chenjia 陈家镇
- Mengtang 孟塘镇
- Ma'an 马鞍镇
- Shizi 狮子镇

== Climate ==
Climate data for Zizhong, elevation 369 m (1,211 ft), (1991–2020 normals, extremes 1981–present)
Month	Jan	Feb	Mar	Apr	May	Jun	Jul	Aug	Sep	Oct	Nov	Dec	Year
Record high °C (°F)	18.7 (65.7)	23.6 (74.5)	32.6 (90.7)	34.5 (94.1)	37.2 (99.0)	37.4 (99.3)	41.5 (106.7)	42.9 (109.2)	39.4 (102.9)	31.4 (88.5)	25.1 (77.2)	18.3 (64.9)	42.9 (109.2)
Mean daily maximum °C (°F)	10.0 (50.0)	13.2 (55.8)	18.3 (64.9)	23.8 (74.8)	27.4 (81.3)	29.1 (84.4)	31.6 (88.9)	31.7 (89.1)	26.8 (80.2)	21.3 (70.3)	16.9 (62.4)	11.3 (52.3)	21.8 (71.2)
Daily mean °C (°F)	7.1 (44.8)	9.7 (49.5)	13.9 (57.0)	18.9 (66.0)	22.5 (72.5)	24.7 (76.5)	27.1 (80.8)	26.9 (80.4)	22.9 (73.2)	18.1 (64.6)	13.7 (56.7)	8.6 (47.5)	17.8 (64.1)
Mean daily minimum °C (°F)	5.0 (41.0)	7.2 (45.0)	10.8 (51.4)	15.3 (59.5)	18.8 (65.8)	21.6 (70.9)	23.8 (74.8)	23.6 (74.5)	20.2 (68.4)	16.0 (60.8)	11.5 (52.7)	6.7 (44.1)	15.0 (59.1)
Record low °C (°F)	−2.4 (27.7)	−0.4 (31.3)	−0.2 (31.6)	5.7 (42.3)	9.6 (49.3)	14.8 (58.6)	17.6 (63.7)	17.0 (62.6)	13.9 (57.0)	4.9 (40.8)	1.4 (34.5)	−1.8 (28.8)	−2.4 (27.7)
Average precipitation mm (inches)	13 (0.5)	16.6 (0.65)	34.9 (1.37)	59 (2.3)	101.8 (4.01)	152.8 (6.02)	184.6 (7.27)	181.7 (7.15)	115.4 (4.54)	60.1 (2.37)	23.3 (0.92)	12.8 (0.50)	956 (37.6)
Average precipitation days (≥ 0.1 mm)	8.9	8.4	9.9	12.4	13.9	15.1	13.3	12.7	15.2	15.4	9.0	8.7	142.9
Average snowy days	0.5	0.3	0	0	0	0	0	0	0	0	0	0.2	1
Average relative humidity (%)	82	78	74	73	72	79	80	78	82	84	82	82	79
Mean monthly sunshine hours	38.3	53.5	100.1	136.8	132.3	111.8	154.5	164.8	92.9	59.3	55.2	34.6	1,134.1
Percentage possible sunshine	12	17	27	35	31	27	36	41	25	17	17	11	25
Source: China Meteorological Administrationall-time extreme temperatureaall-time July high
