= Zi Prefecture (Shandong) =

Imperial prefecture in Shandong, China

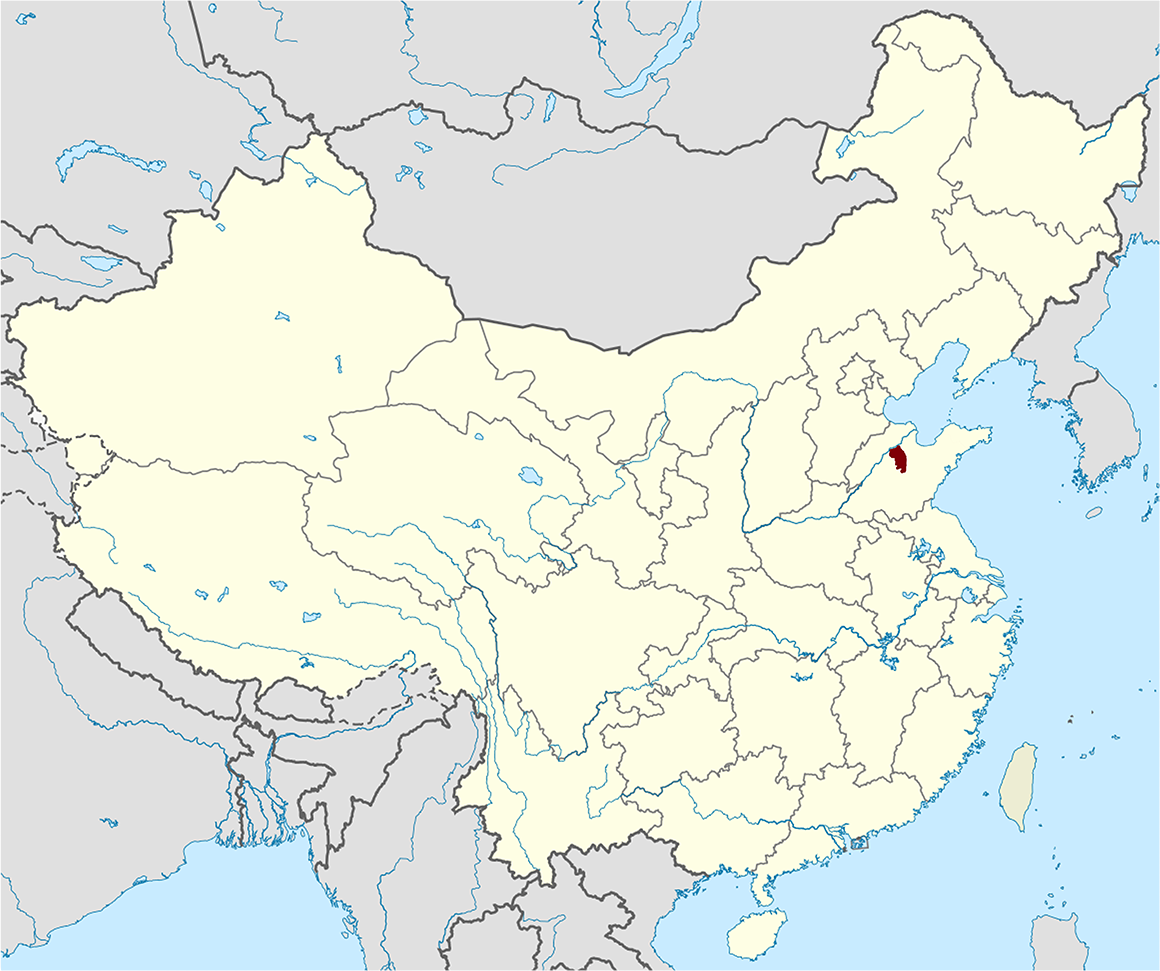
- Chinese: 淄州
Transcriptions
Standard Mandarin
- Hanyu Pinyin: Zī Zhōu
- Wade–Giles: Tzu^{1} Chou^{1}

Zizhou or Zi Prefecture was a zhou (prefecture) in imperial China centering on modern Zibo, Shandong, China. It existed (intermittently) from 596 until 1264.

== Geography ==
The administrative region of Zizhou in the Tang dynasty is in modern central Shandong. It probably includes parts of modern:

- Under the administration of Zibo:
  - Zibo
  - Huantai County
  - Gaoqing County
- Under the administration of Binzhou:
  - Zouping County
