= Zi Prefecture (Sichuan) =

Imperial prefectures in Sichuan, China

Zizhou or Zi Prefecture (資州) was a zhou (prefecture) in imperial China centering around modern Zizhong County, Sichuan, China. It existed (intermittently) from 587 until 1913.

== Geography ==
The administrative region of Zizhou in the Tang dynasty is in modern eastern Sichuan. It probably includes parts of modern:

- Under the administration of Neijiang:
  - Zizhong County
  - Neijiang
- Under the administration of Ziyang:
  - Ziyang
