= Brinton =

Brinton may refer to:

== Places ==
- Brinton (crater), on Pluto
- Brinton, Michigan, United States
- Brinton, Norfolk, England

== People ==
- Anna Cox Brinton (1887–1969), American classics scholar, Quaker worker
- Crane Brinton, American historian of France and the history of ideas
- Daniel Garrison Brinton, American archaeologist and ethnologist
- Donna M. Brinton, American linguist
- Edward Brinton (1924–2010), oceanographer and biologist
- Ellen Starr Brinton (1886–1954), pacifist, speaker and archivist
- Emma Southwick Brinton (1834–1922), American Civil War nurse, traveller, correspondent
- Henry G. Brinton, American minister and author
- Howard Brinton (1884–1973), Quaker activist
- John Brinton, British Liberal politician
- Laurel J. Brinton, Canadian-American linguist
- Maurice Brinton, writer for libertarian socialist group Solidarity
- Sal Brinton, British Liberal Democrat politician
- Sam Brinton, American nuclear engineer and LGBTQ activist
- Willard C. Brinton (1880–1957), American engineer, and information visualisation pioneer
