= Stephen Yang =

Sichuanese surgeon, educator, and Quaker peace activist

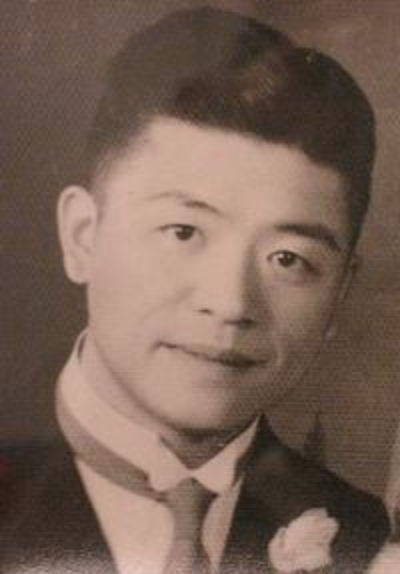
- Stephen Yang in 1942
- Born: 1911; Chongqing, Sichuan, Manchu Empire
- Died: 2007 (aged 95–96); Sichuan, China
- Other name: Stephen C. H. Yang
- Education: West China Union University
- Occupations: Surgeon, medical educator, Quaker peace activist
- Employer(s): West China Union University; West China Medical University
- Spouse: Ruth Dsang (m. 1942)

Stephen Yang (1911–2007), also known as Stephen C. H. Yang, (Note: traditional Chinese: 楊振華; simplified Chinese: 杨振华; pinyin: Yáng Zhènhuá; Wade–Giles: Yang Chên-hua; Sichuanese romanization: Iang Chen-hua.) was a Sichuanese surgeon, medical educator, and Quaker peace activist.

== Life and career ==
Stephen Yang was born in 1911 in Chongqing, Sichuan, and raised by parents of the Quaker faith (Religious Society of Friends). In 1922, he lived at the Friends Middle School on the campus of the West China Union University in Chengdu, cofounded by American Baptist Foreign Mission Society, American Methodist Episcopal Mission, Canadian Methodist Mission, and Friends' Foreign Mission Association. After graduating from the Union University in 1938 with a medical degree, he became a teacher at its College of Medicine while continuing his medical training.

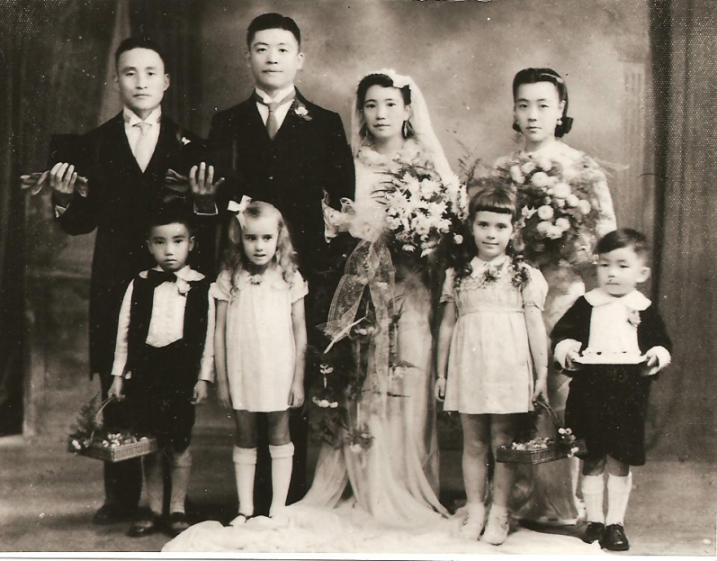
Wedding of Stephen Yang and Ruth Dsang

In 1942, Yang married Ruth Dsang, daughter of Lincoln L. G. Dsang, second president of West China Union University. The wedding took place in Chengdu. Dsang converted to Quakerism from Methodism upon marriage. In the late 1940s, the couple traveled to Washington, D.C. and Philadelphia for their residency training, where they spent several days at Pendle Hill Quaker Center for Study and Contemplation with Anna and Howard Brinton, who had visited them in Sichuan in 1944. They also toured hospitals in the United States and Canada.

Yang spent one year (1970–1971) in prison during the Cultural Revolution. In the 1980s, after his "rehabilitation", he attended several international meetings and was involved in the International Physicians for the Prevention of Nuclear War. After retiring from the West China Medical University, he had continued working as a mentor to English teachers sent by British Quakers to teach at the university.

== See also ==
- Quakerism in Sichuan
- H. T. Silcock – English Quaker missionary to Sichuan
- Y. C. James Yen – Sichuanese Protestant and educator
