= Quakerism in Sichuan =

The history of Quakerism in Sichuan (or "West China") (Note: Sichuan, formerly romanized as Sz-chwan, Szechwan, or Szechuan; also referred to as "West China".) began in 1887 when missionaries began to arrive from the United Kingdom. Missionaries founded schools and established meeting groups. Nonetheless, missionary activity in China generated controversy among many native Chinese and faced armed opposition during both the Boxer Rebellion and the later Chinese Communist Revolution. Although the former did not affect Sichuan so much as some other parts of China, the province was one of the hotbeds of anti-missionary riots throughout its ecclesiastical history.

Numerous mission properties and native church leaders in Sichuan were respectively destroyed and killed by communists in the mid-1930s. Missionaries were expelled and activity ceased after the communist take over of China in 1949. Under government oppression, ties were cut with foreign Quaker groups, and Quakerism in Sichuan was merged into the Three-Self Patriotic Church.

== History ==
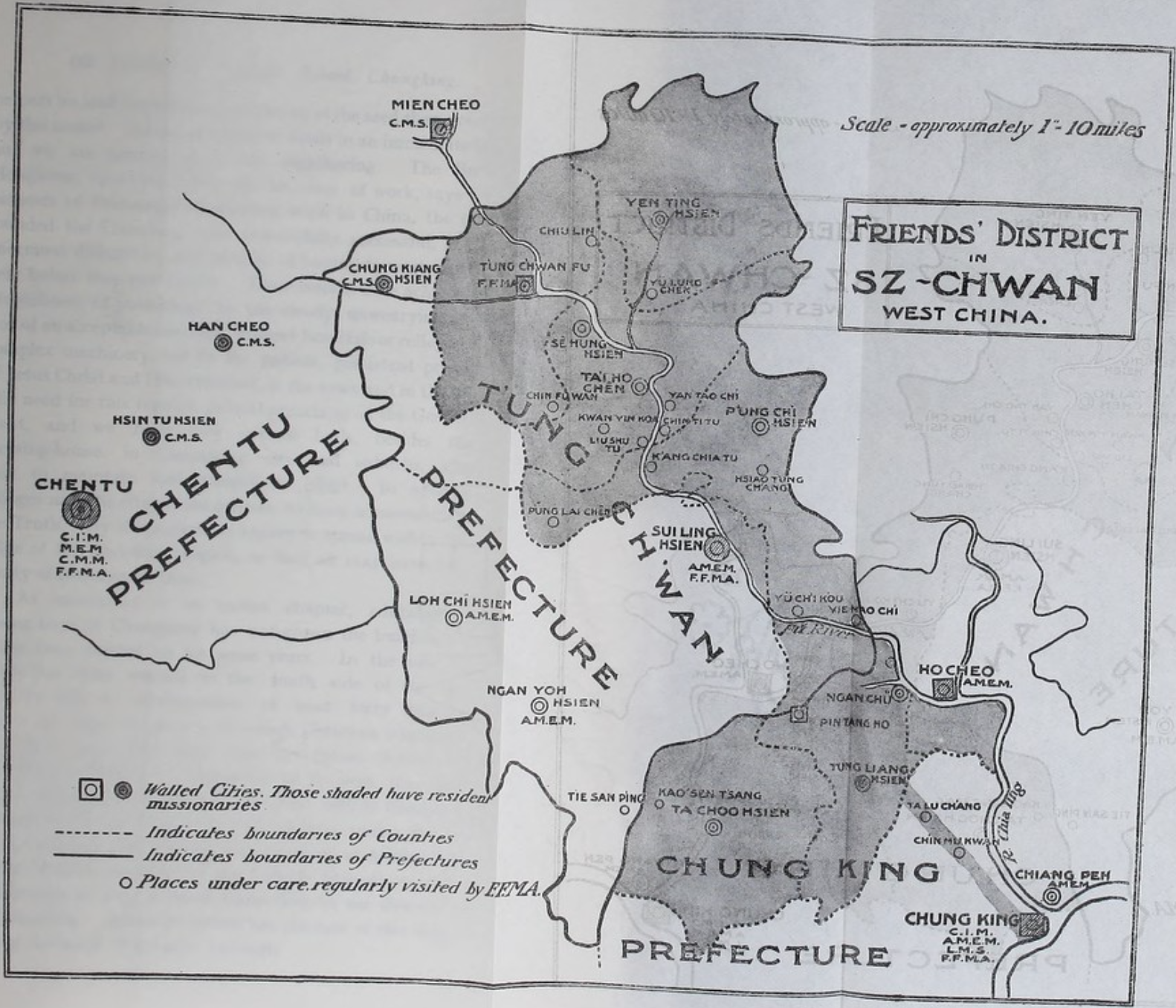
Friends' Foreign Mission Association's District in Sichuan

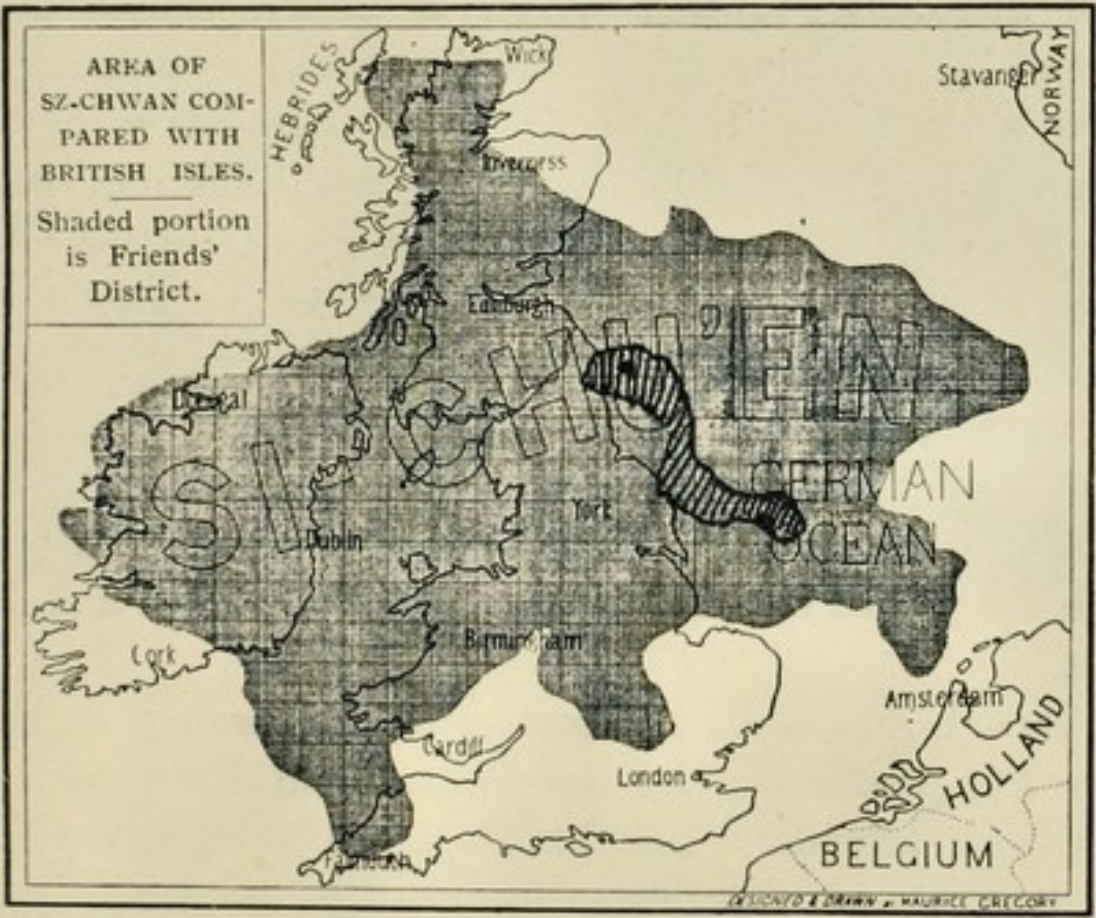
Area of Sichuan compared with British Isles. Shaded portion is Friends' District.

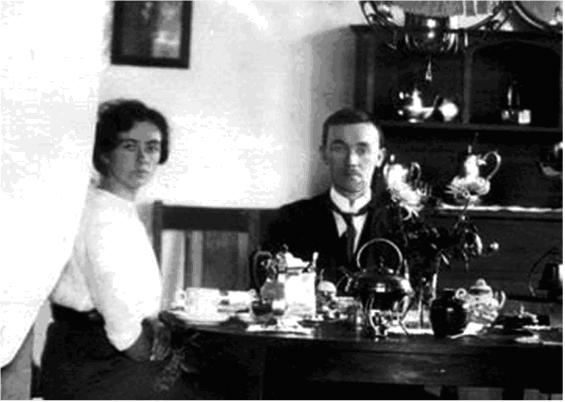
Robert John and Mary Jane Davidson in Chengdu (Chentu), before 1925

In 1882, an article titled "Shall the Gospel be preached to this generation of the Chinese?" by Dr. George King was published in London. Several members of the Society of Friends reading it, were impressed with the fact that the Society had no representatives engaged in missionary effort in China. Three years later (1885), two Irish Friends, Robert John Davidson and his wife Mary Jane Davidson, were appointed by the Friends' Foreign Mission Association (FFMA, belonging to London Yearly Meeting) as missionaries to work in China. They left England in September, 1886, and reached Sichuan the following year. At a local medical assistant Mr. Sie's suggestion, the Davidsons paid their first visit to Tungchwan in the end of 1887.

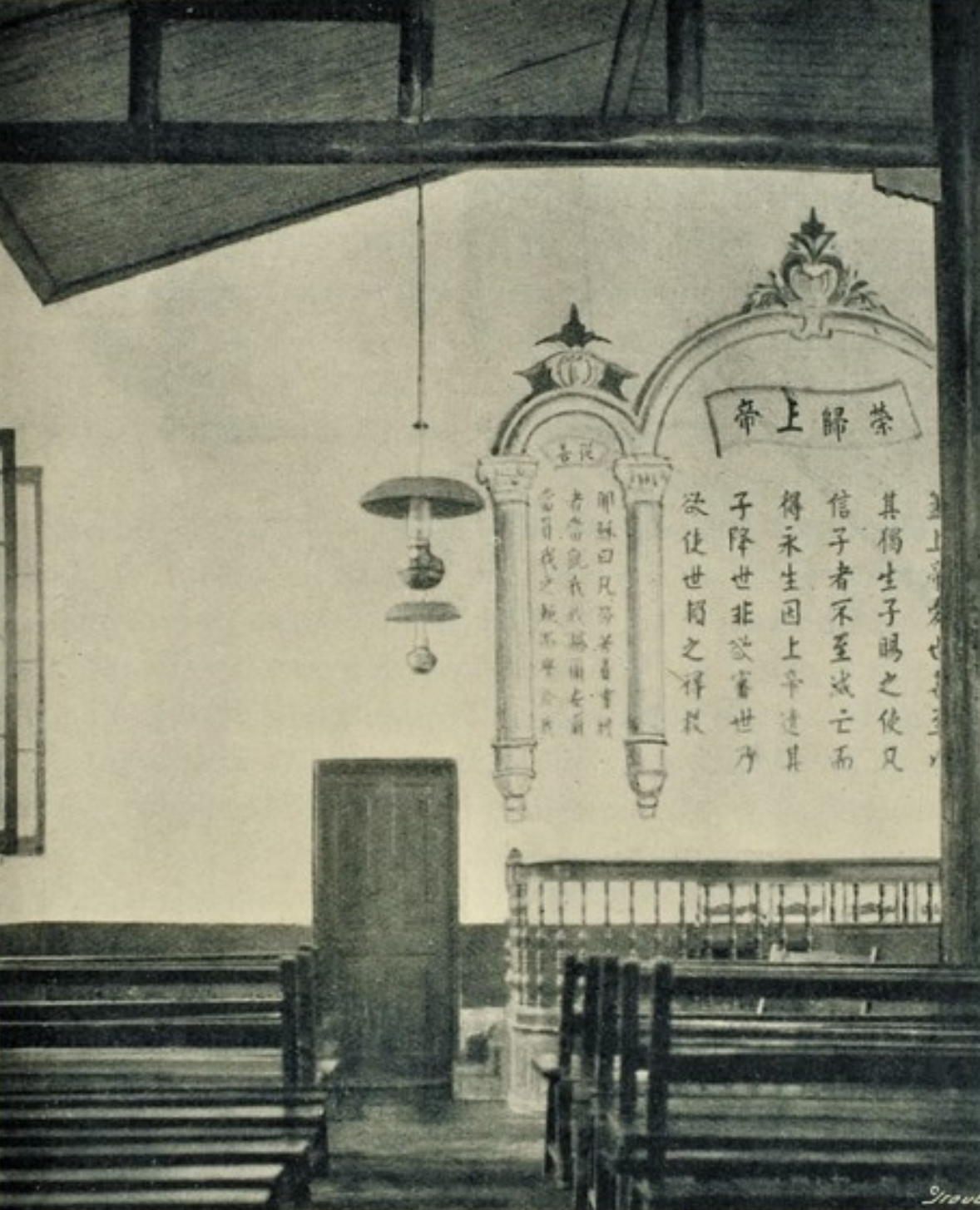
Men's side of Chongqing (Chungking) Meeting House. The characters in the left-hand panel, above platform, are a translation of Matt. xi. 28, 29; those to the right John iii. 16; before 1905.

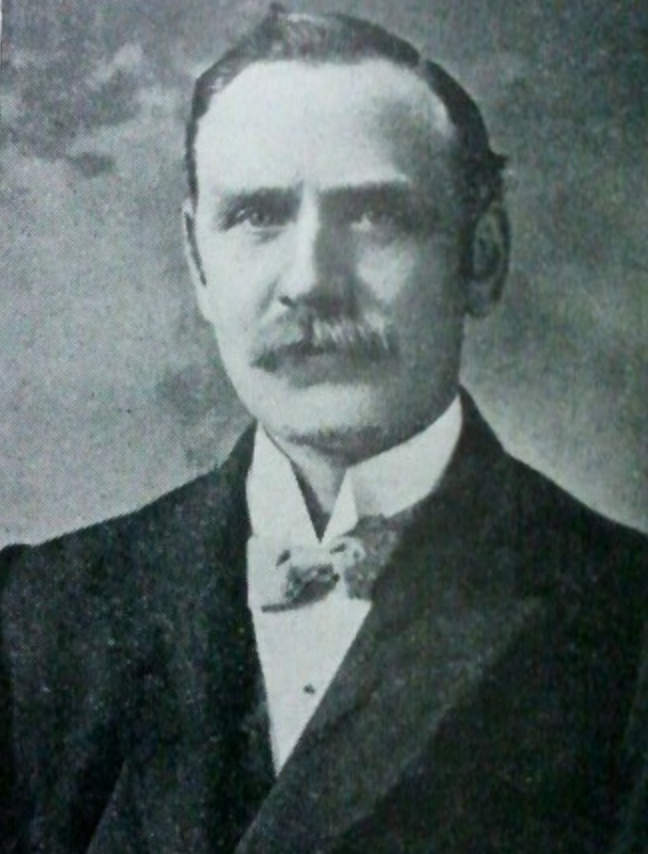
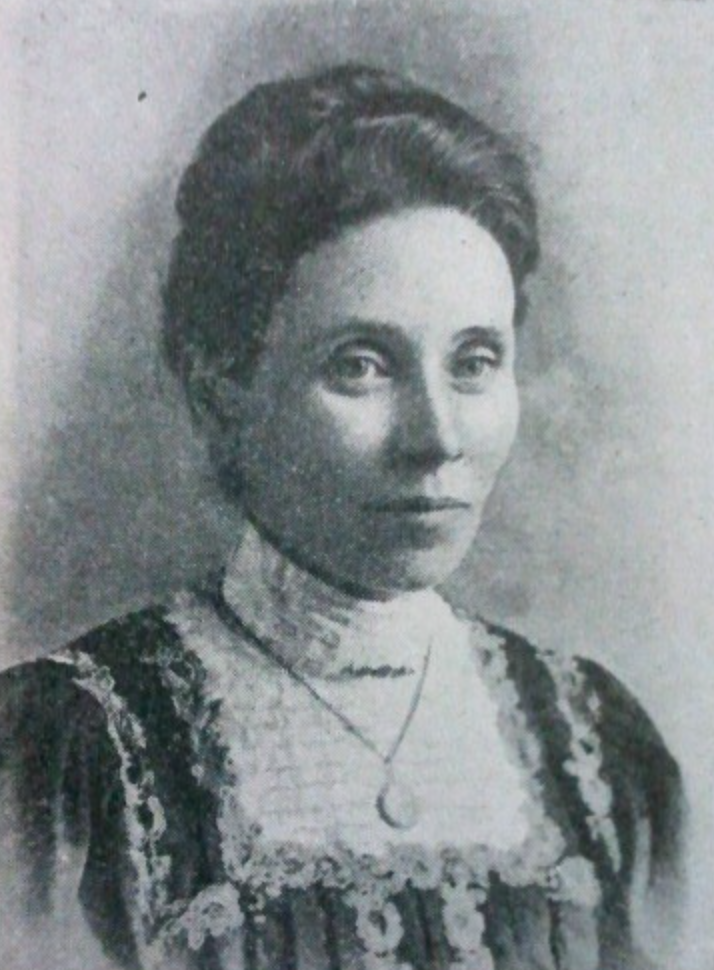
Isaac Mason and his wife Esther were stationed at Tongchuan and did pioneer work at Shehongxian and Suining. He also made the first Chinese translations of Quaker writings.

In 1889, after a series of problems regarding their long-term settlement with the local authorities of Tongchuan (Tungchwan), they were told that they had "no right to be there". R. J. Davidson had no choice but to turn to Chongqing, the only place which seemed open to him. There a small house was rented until the following spring, when the large premises in the White Dragon Fountain Street became the first home of the Mission. Opening services were held in March 1890, and a dispensary was opened soon after. Frederic S. Deane joined the Mission and established a boys' school at the Great Ridge Street in 1892. That winter four more missionaries were added to the band. Leonard Wigham joined Deane at the young men's house, while Alice M. Beck and Margaret Southall went to another mission house; and Caroline N. Southall had already started a girls' school on those premises. In 1893, Mira L. Cumber and Isaac Mason joined the mission. A meeting house was opened in March 1894.

In May 1894, R. J. Davidson and Mason travelled to Yangtaochi in Tongchuan. They rented part of an inn for dispensing medicine. In the autumn of 1894, Mason returned alone to Yangtaochi. He spent several weeks there, living at an inn, dispensing medicine and preaching daily. He had gathered a few people during this period, and with them he held many meetings in dirty little rooms at the inns where he stayed. These visits subsequently extended to the cities of Taihezhen (Taihochen) and Shehongxian (Sehunghsien), which had been developed into an important branch of the Tongchuan work later known as the Mission's Northern District.

In 1895, a serious outbreak of anti-foreign agitation spread throughout the province. Open-air preaching had been considered dangerous for long periods at a time, and dispensary patients decreased by half the number. The missionaries lived for weeks together in constant fear of an outbreak. In 1897, the FFMA purchased an estate on the hills south of Chongqing and turned it into a school for missionaries' children, which was opened in March 1898.

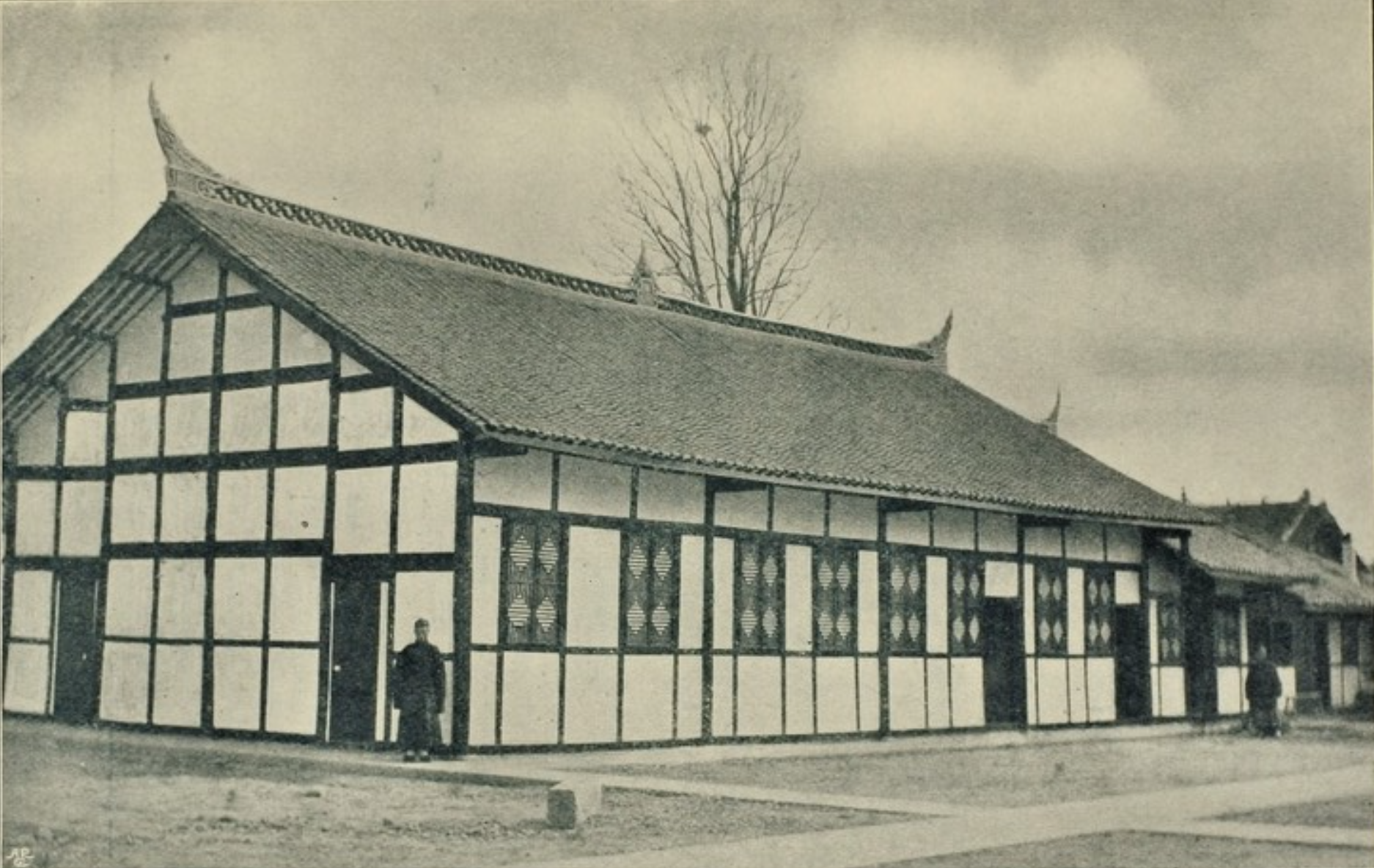
Quaker meeting house at Tongchuan, before 1905

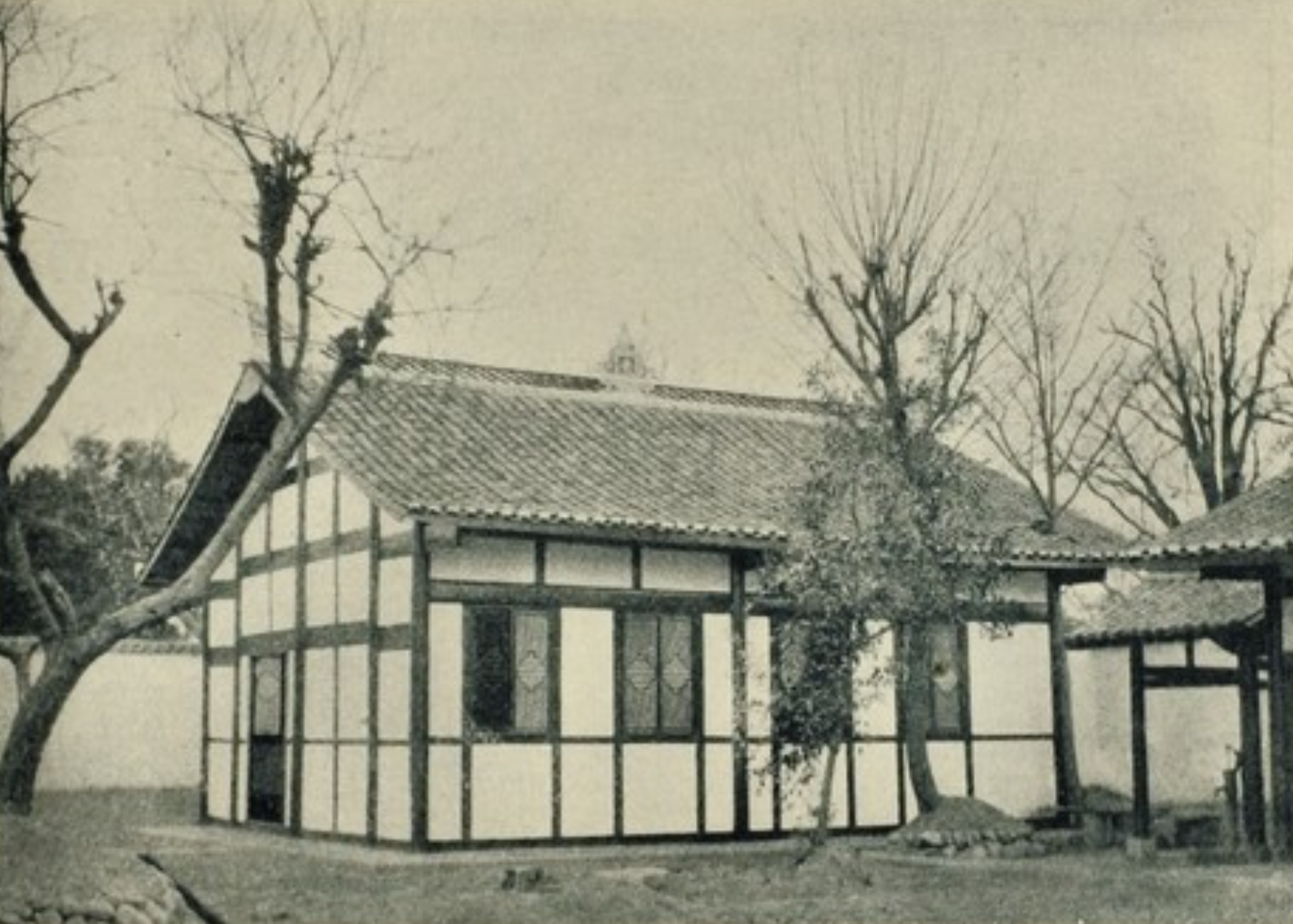
Boys' School at Tongchuan, before 1905

In 1899, A. Warburton Davidson went to reside at Shehongxian. He was pursued and severely beaten by a crowd after selling books in a temple yard at one of the neighbouring markets named Yu Lung Chen. In consequence of his injuries he was taken to Chongqing for rest. That same year Mason and his party were appointed to live at Tongchuan, they took up residence early in 1900. They opened a dispensary and held meetings for worship in a very dilapidated chapel made out of unused small rooms. In 1902, Mira L. Cumber and Dr. Lucy E. Harris joined the Tongchuan mission, the latter being FFMA's first qualified medical missionary in China. The Tongchuan Boys' School was opened before the missionaries taking up residence in that prefecture. The Girls' School was commenced in 1902 by Cumber. It had only eight students the first year, but there were thirty the following year, and by 1905 the number had doubled.

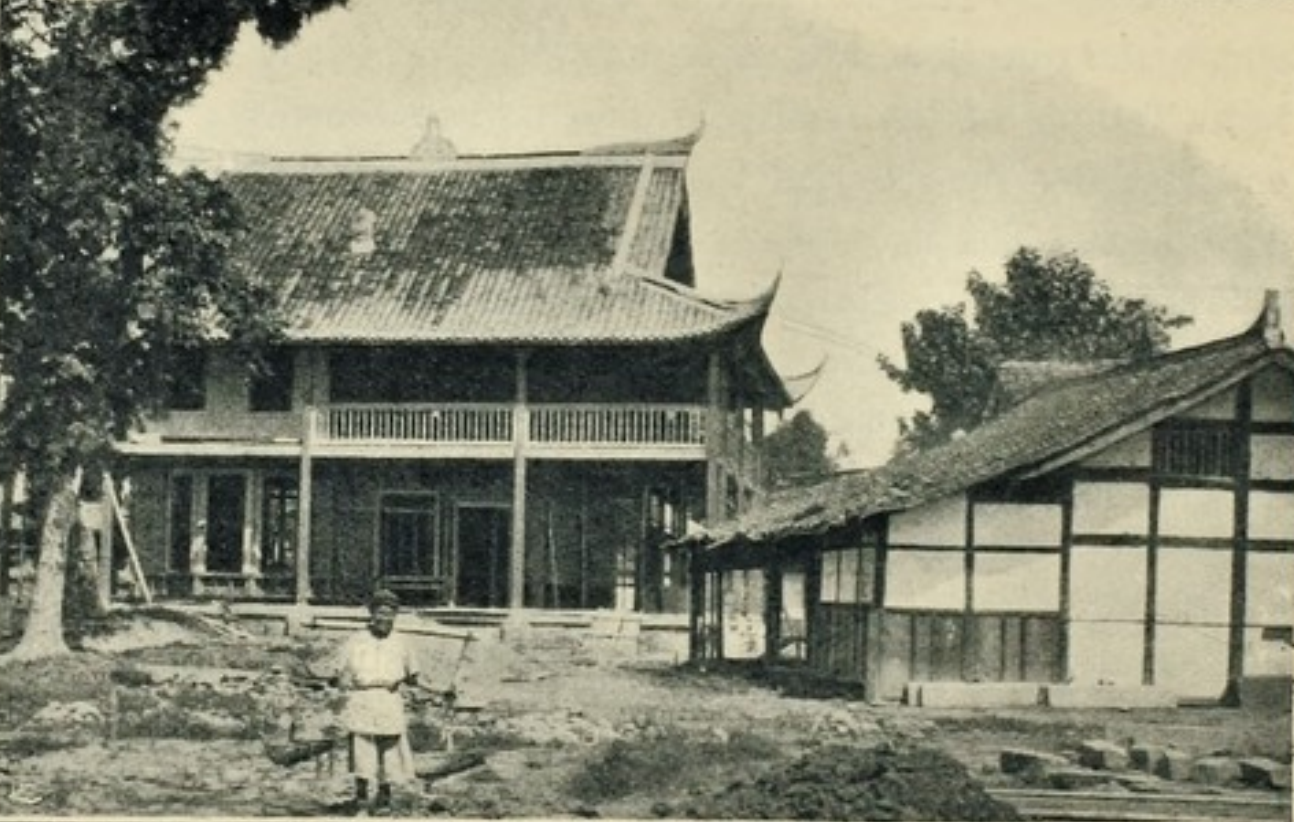
First house for FFMA mission at Chengdu, before 1905

During this period, two new mission centres were opened in Chengdu, the capital, and Suining (Sui-ling Hsien), a county situated between Tongchuan and Chongqing. The former was opened by Robert J. and Mary J. Davidson, the work was joined by Dr. Henry T. and Elizabeth J. Hodgkin in 1905. Isaac and Esther L. Mason moved to Suining, work at Tongchuan had been taken up by Edward B. and Margaret Vardon.

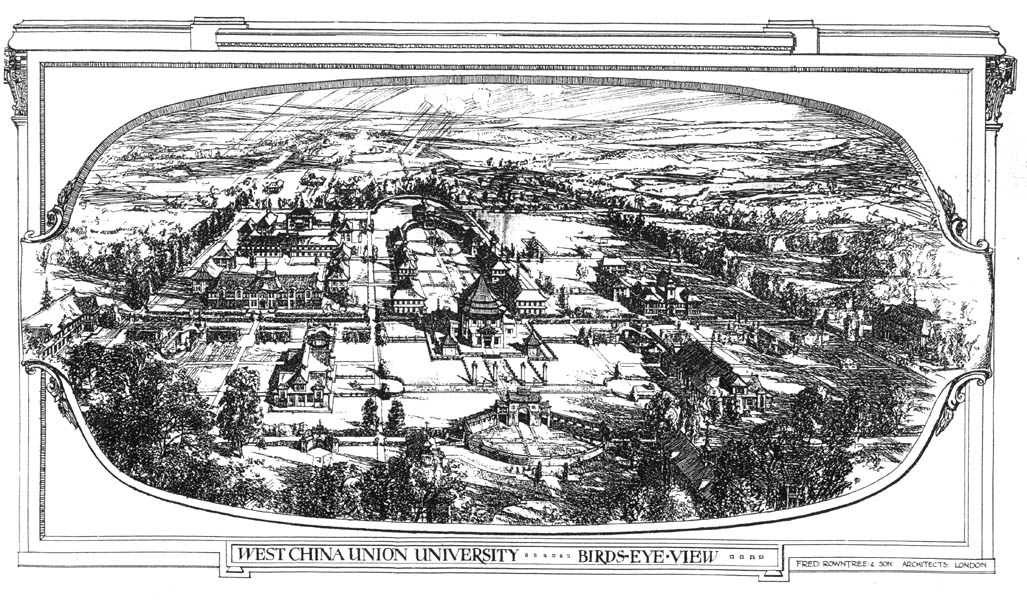
Frederick Rowntree's architectural drawing for West China Union University

The Szechwan Yearly Meeting founded in 1904 with 56 local converts, was constituted of five Monthly Meetings: Chongqing, Tongchuan, Chengdu, Suining and Tongliang (Tungliang). By the end of 1921, the English Friends had 429 church members; and by 1937, 460 members. Although they made few converts, their work had a considerable impact. The Chongqing Friends School thrived, and the International Friends Institute opened in 1909, became a place where people could meet freely in a peaceful setting. Isaac Mason made the first Chinese translations of Quaker writings. The FFMA was also one of the four mission societies responsible for the creation of West China Union University in 1910, together with American Baptist Foreign Mission Society (American Baptist Churches USA), American Methodist Episcopal Mission (Methodist Episcopal Church), and Canadian Methodist Mission (Methodist Church of Canada). The university's buildings were designed by the English Quaker architect Frederick Rowntree. H. T. Silcock, an FFMA missionary, began to work at the Union University in 1911, and was later appointed as vice president.

In 1930, Clifford Morgan Stubbs, a New Zealand Quaker missionary and Professor of Chemistry at the West China Union University, was stabbed to death by communists.

The Friends' Ambulance Unit sent a team of 40 volunteers to provide medical assistance in China in mid 1941 during the Second World War, known as the China Convoy, which operated across the provinces of Yunnan, Guizhou, Sichuan and beyond, until their responsibility for the relief work there was passed to the American Friends Service Committee in 1946. Over the five years about 200 Westerners and 60 Chinese had taken part, eight died and others had their health permanently damaged. Most of the Westerners were British nationals, with substantial numbers of Americans, Canadians and New Zealanders, and a handful of other nationalities. The Chinese members were mainly Christian students from the West China Union University.

== Tongchuan Monthly Meeting ==
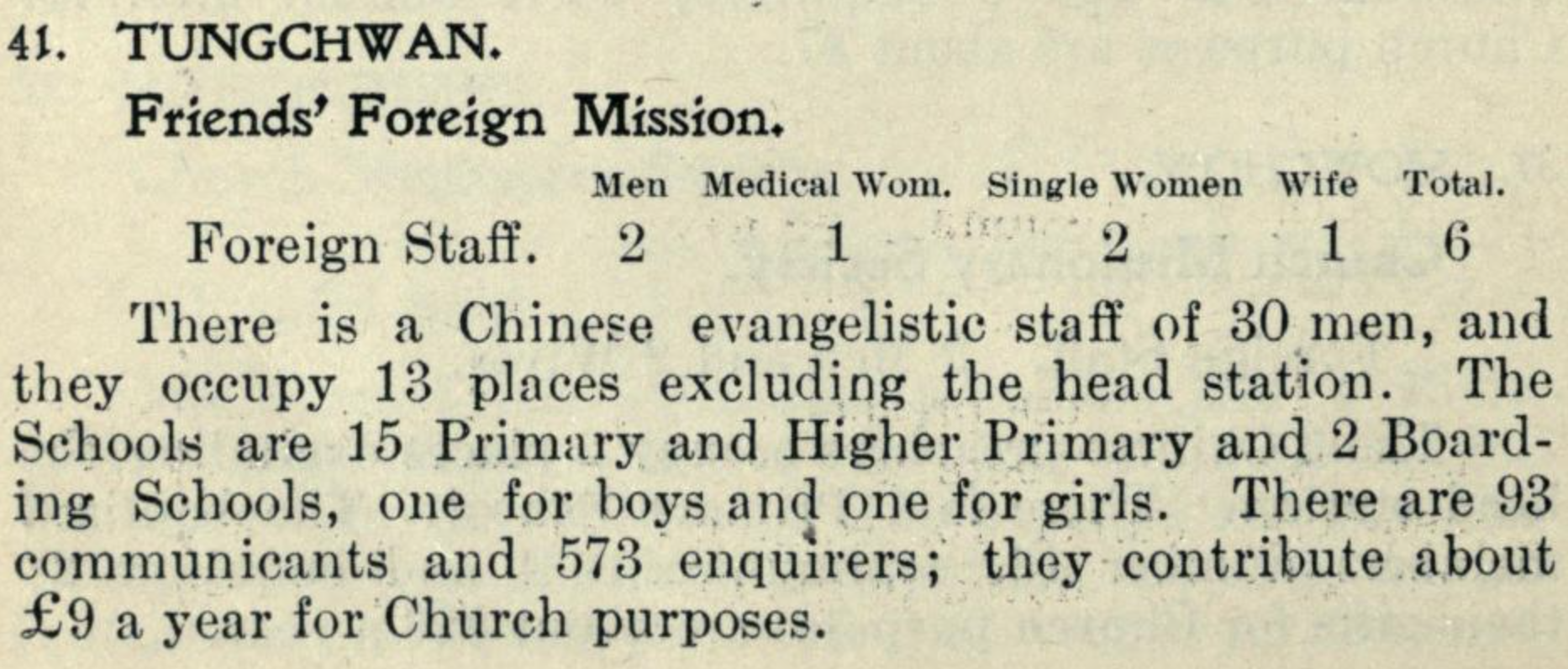
Survey of Friends' Foreign Mission Association's mission work in Tongchuan (Tungchwan), published in 1913

The Tongchuan (Tungchwan) Monthly Meeting (later known as Santai Monthly Meeting) established by Isaac Mason in 1900, was the largest mission branch of Friends' Foreign Mission Association's Northern District, governing four towns under the administration of Tongchuan Prefecture (Lingxing, Jingfu, Anju, Qiulin), and member churches of nine counties in other administrative regions (including Yanting, Yulongzhen, Shehongxian and its seat Taihochen). Most of these member churches were closed in the 1940s. According to the statistics provided by Tongchuan Government in 1944, there were 278 local converts consisting of 195 men and 83 women. By the time of the Communists' takeover of Sichuan in late 1949, only the three congregations in Tongchuan city centre, Lingxing and Jingfu were still active.

== After 1949 ==
After the communist takeover of China in 1949, Protestant churches in the country were forced to sever their ties with respective overseas churches, which has thus led to the merging of all the denominations into the communist-sanctioned Three-Self Patriotic Church. The Jingfu meeting house was closed in the early 1950s after the expulsion of foreign missionaries. In 1953, more than 310 people from Lingxing, Liuying, Le'an and Xinde were converted by a Chinese missionary Lu Ruiyu (陸瑞玉) based at Lingxing. However, all church activities had ceased by 1956. It was not until 1980 that Protestantism was revived in Lingxing and Suhe, where there were relatively large numbers of Protestants. By the end of 1986, there were more than 1,200 officially registered Protestants in Santai County (formerly Tongchuan). In 1987, more than 1,000 people gathered for Christmas service in Lingxing.

== Gallery ==
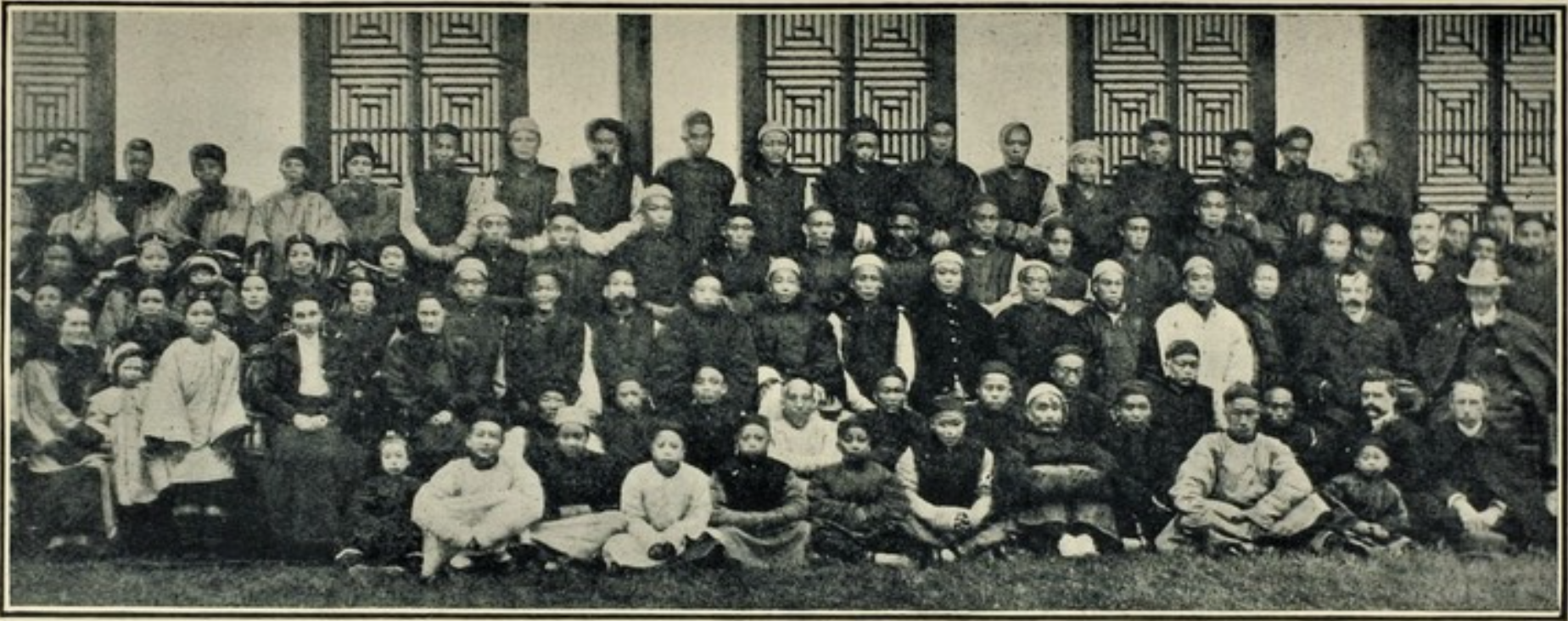
The visit of the deputation to Tongchuan in 1904, photographed outside the Meeting House. The three Members of the deputation, together with Isaac Mason and Edward B. Vardon, may be seen on the extreme right; Dr. Lucy Harris on the extreme left; and, nearer the centre, Esther L. Mason and Mira L. Cumber.

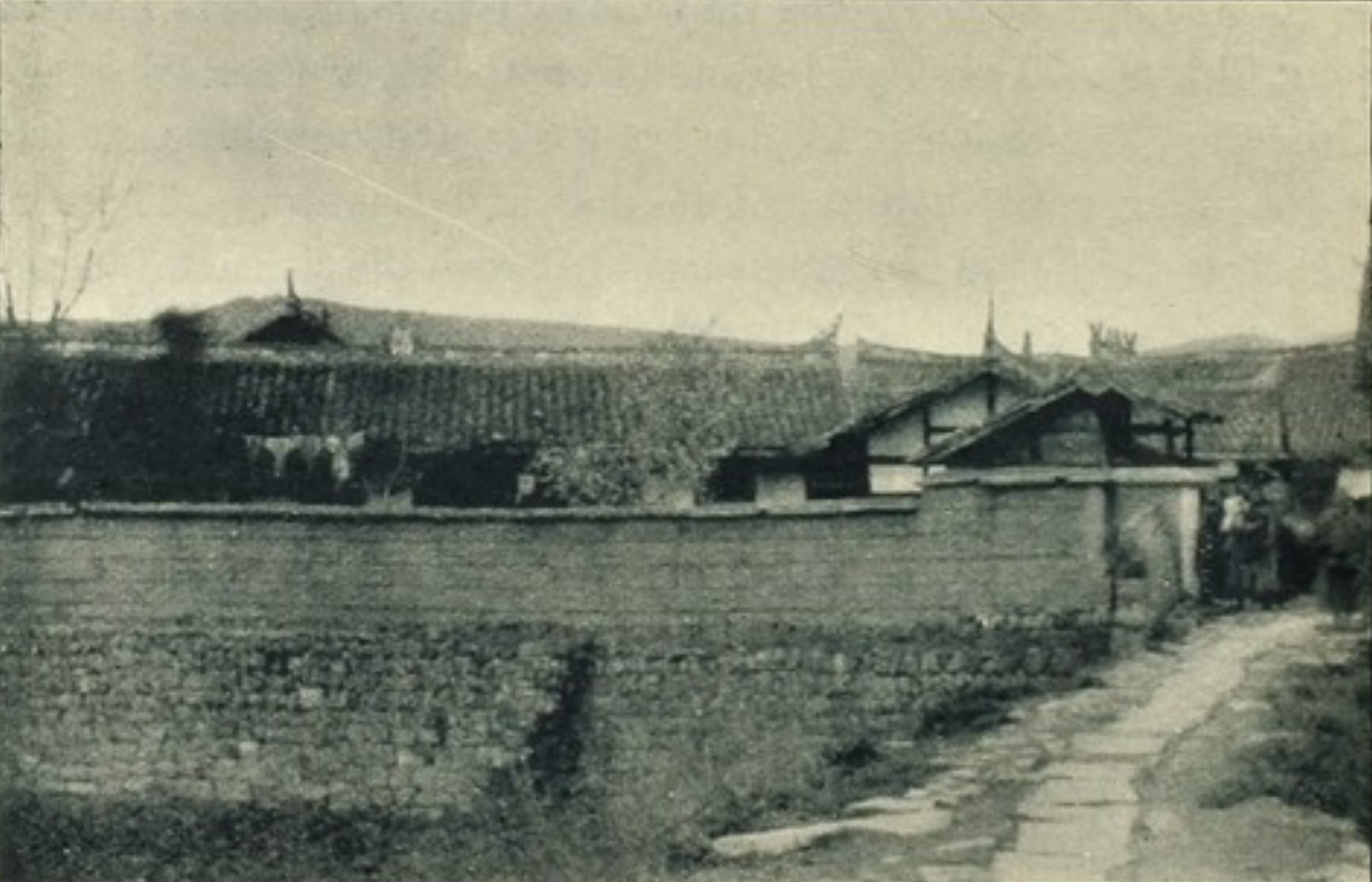
First premises rented in Tongchuan, before 1905

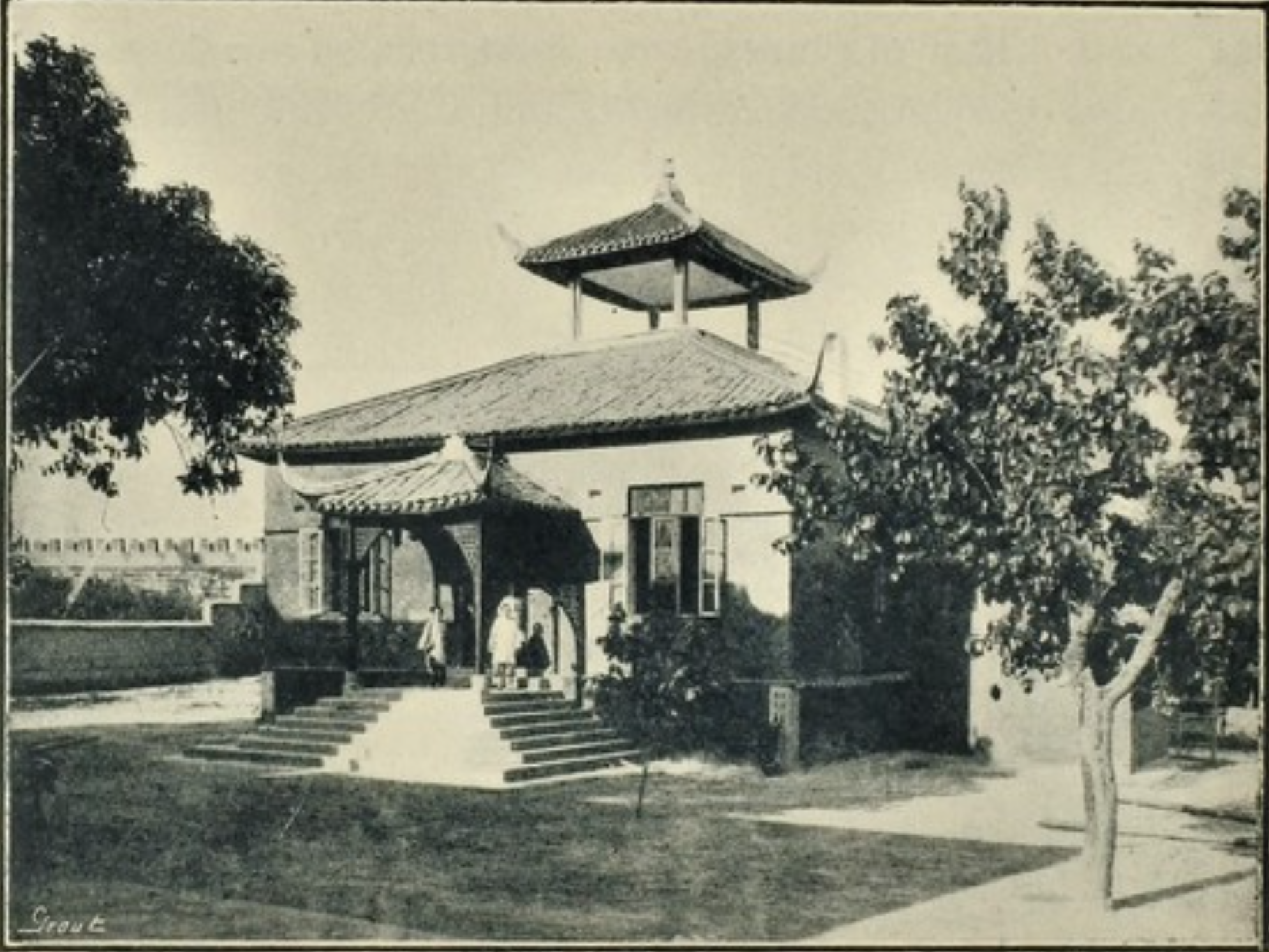
Women's Hospital at Tongchuan, before 1905

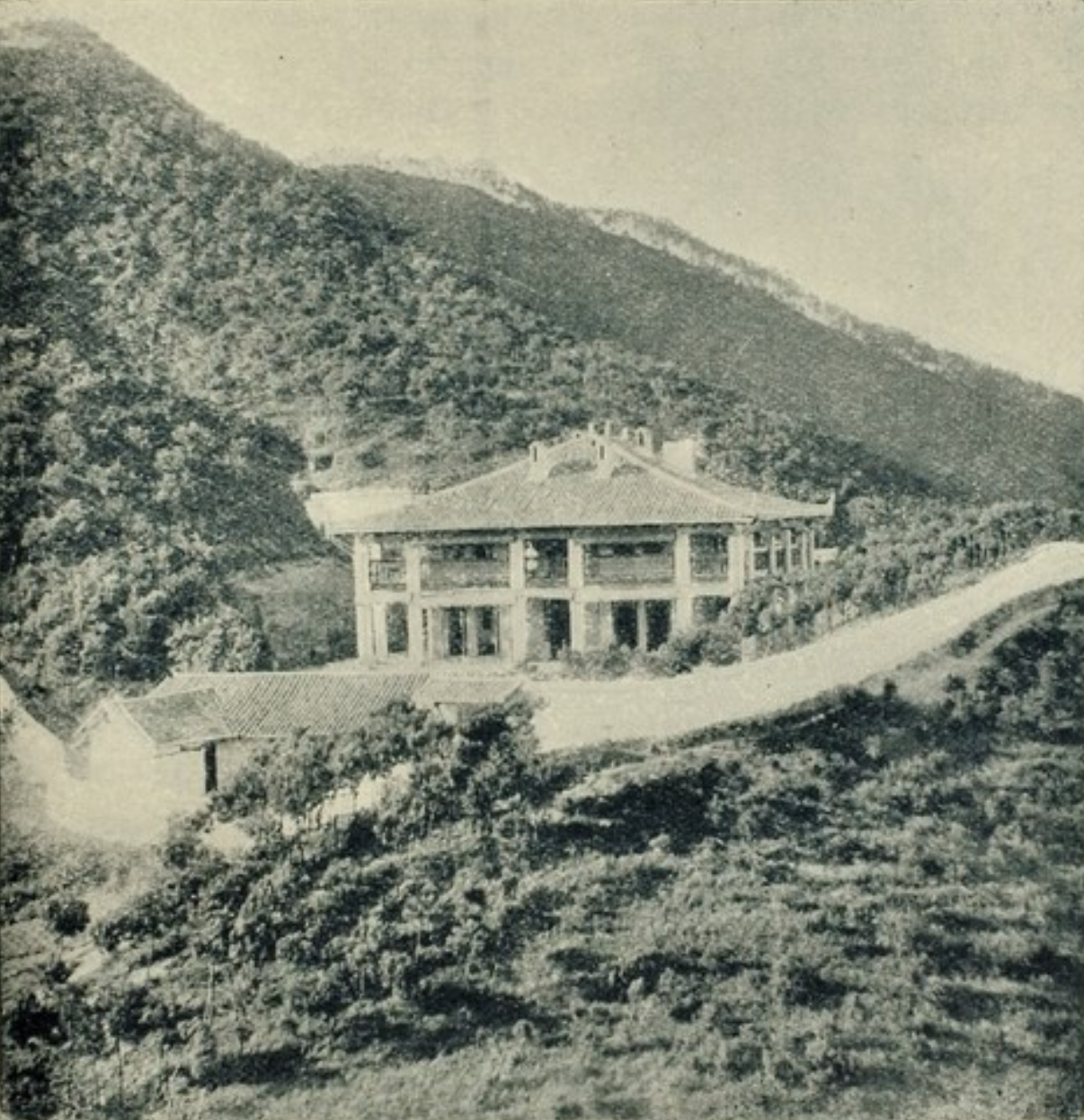
Hill School for missionaries' children, erected on the hills, on the south of the Yangtze, opposite Chongqing

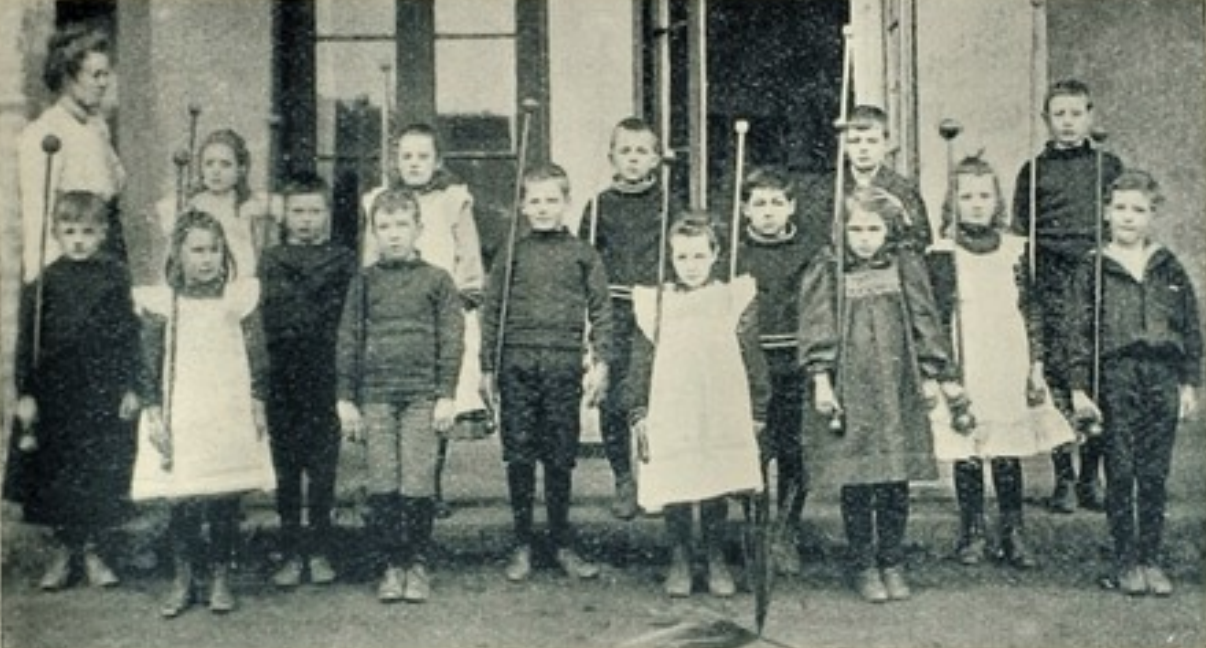
Missionaries' children at drill at the Hill School, Chongqing, before 1905

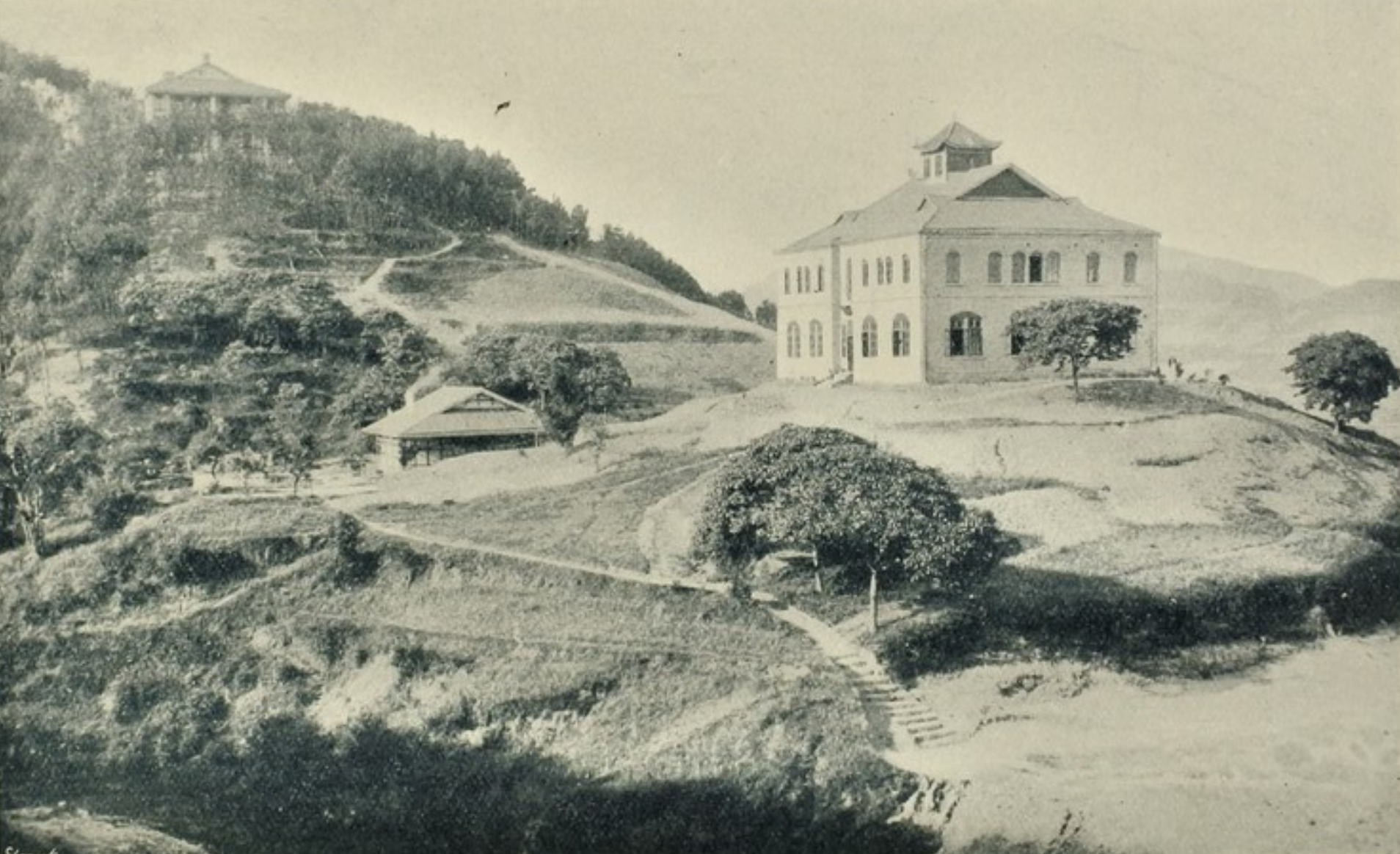
Boys' Boarding School at Chongqing, situated on the hills opposite the city, before 1905

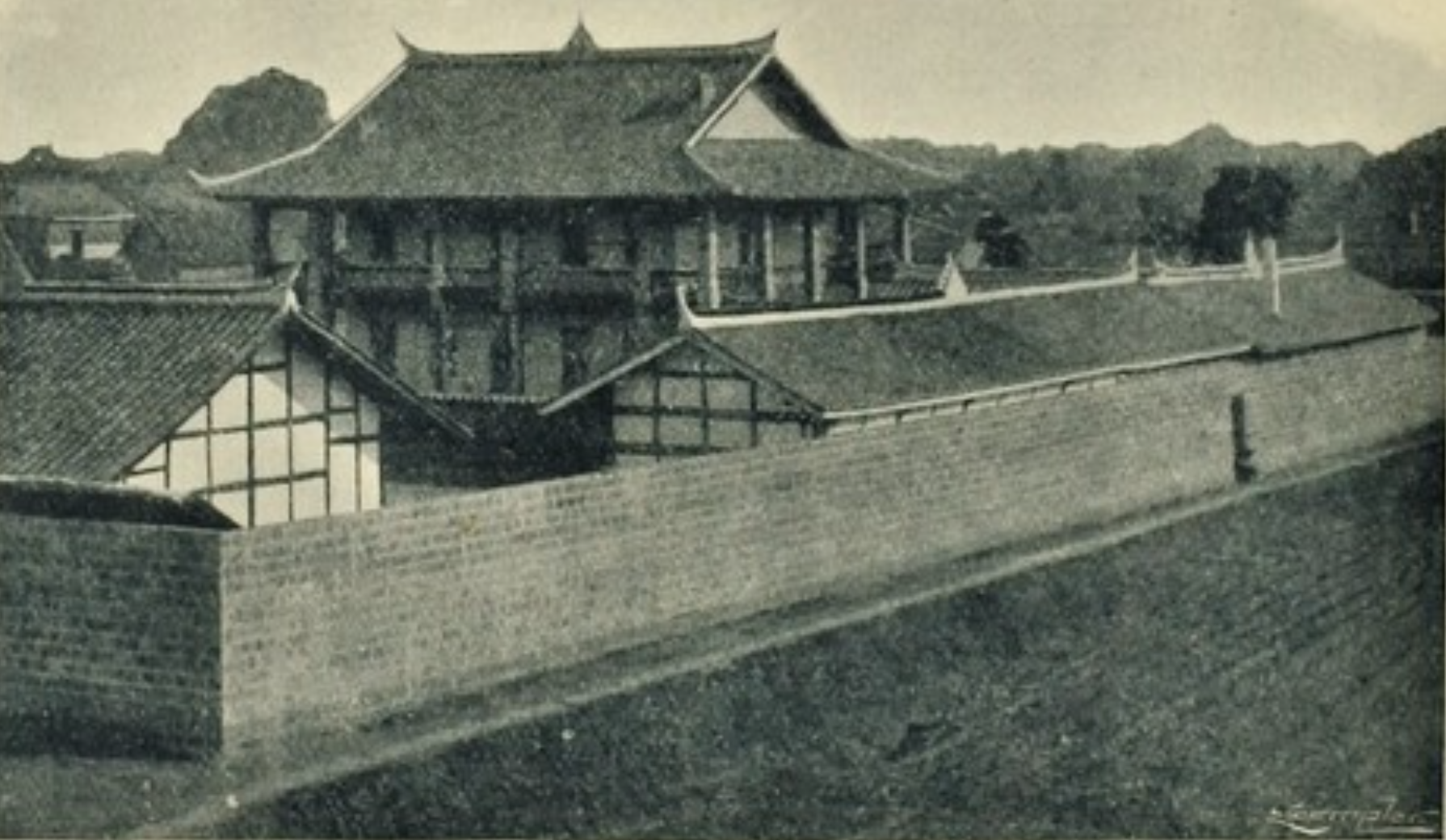
FFMA's new building at Suining, before 1905

== See also ==
- Christianity in Sichuan
  - Church of the East in Sichuan
  - Catholic Church in Sichuan
  - Protestantism in Sichuan
    - Anglicanism in Sichuan
    - Methodism in Sichuan
    - Baptist Christianity in Sichuan
    - Seventh-day Adventist Church in Sichuan
- The West China Missionary News
- Stephen Yang
- Yearly Meeting
- Anti-Christian Movement (China)
- Anti-missionary riots in China
- Antireligious campaigns of the Chinese Communist Party
- Denunciation Movement
- House church (China)
- Quaker missionaries
