= Life of Isaac Mason as a Slave =

1893 memoir and slave narrative by Isaac Mason

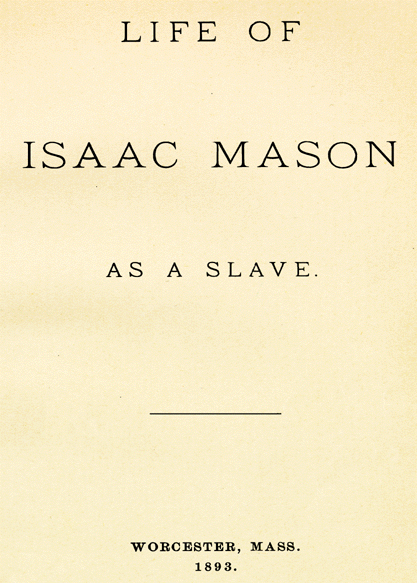
- Title page of Life of Isaac Mason as a Slave (Worcester, Massachusetts, 1893)
- Author: Isaac Mason
- Language: English
- Genre: Slave narrative, memoir
- Publisher: Self-published
- Publication date: 1893
- Publication place: United States
- Media type: Print
- Pages: 74

Life of Isaac Mason as a Slave is an 1893 memoir and slave narrative by Isaac Mason, self-published in Worcester, Massachusetts. Written when Mason was seventy-one, the 74-page narrative recounts his birth into slavery in Kent County, Maryland, in 1822, his escape to Pennsylvania in December 1846, his years as a fugitive in the North, and his participation in James Redpath's Haitian emigration program of 1860. It is among the most detailed firsthand accounts of slavery in nineteenth-century Maryland and belongs to a group of postbellum slave narratives published by formerly enslaved residents of Worcester.

== Background ==
Mason, who escaped slavery under the name William ("Bill") Thompson and settled permanently in Worcester in 1851, was for decades one of the city's most prominent African American citizens. In his preface, Mason writes that he had lectured on "certain portions" of his life and that friends who heard him speak repeatedly urged him to write his history; he says he "reluctantly concluded to accede to their wishes" and offers the book as "a truthful sketch of my eventful life in the dark days of slavery," told "in a plain matter-of-fact way." The book opens with a commendatory note from Senator George Frisbie Hoar of Massachusetts, dated July 19, 1893, in which Hoar states that he has known Mason since 1850, vouches for his honesty and intelligence, and commends the book to the public. Mason died five years after its publication, in 1898.

== Summary ==
Mason describes his birth on May 14, 1822, in Georgetown Cross Roads, Kent County, Maryland, to a free father and an enslaved mother, which made him from birth the property of his mother's enslaver, Hannah Woodland. From the age of five or six he served as Woodland's personal servant until her death in 1837, when the estate was broken up: his grandfather was freed on account of his age, his father purchased his mother and infant sister for $600, and Mason was hired out to a physician, Dr. Hyde, to pay a $25 estate debt. Under the Hydes, Mason writes, he was whipped daily and denied meals; he fled the household during Christmas week after fighting off a beating from Hyde's wife.

Delivered on New Year's Eve to James Mansfield Jr., a cabinetmaker and undertaker in Chestertown, Mason endured a severe cowhide beating from Mansfield's wife and weekly whippings in the cellar before being transferred to farm work, where over five years he raised the yield of Mansfield's sixty-acre farm sixfold. The Chestertown chapters culminate in an August 1846 incident in which Mason, ordered to eat spoiled meat, fed his portion to a dog; Mansfield beat him, and when Mason fought back, fired three shots at him as he fled. Mason dwells on the fact that Mansfield was a local Methodist preacher and his own class leader, questioning the religious hypocrisy of a man who preached to the enslaved and attempted to kill one.

Learning in December 1846 that he was to be traded and sent to a slave trader in New Orleans, Mason arranged an escape with two other enslaved men, Joshua and George, guided by two Black conductors, Joe Brown and Perry Augustus. The narrative recounts their night flight through Delaware — including a day spent hiding under a fallen oak while a fox hunt swept the woods around them — and their crossing into Pennsylvania before dawn, which Mason describes as stepping "from bondage into liberty, from darkness into light."

The later chapters trace Mason's insecure freedom in the North: farm work in Chester County, Pennsylvania; his marriage in 1849; flight to Boston and then Worcester after the Fugitive Slave Act of 1850 brought his former enslavers' agents to Philadelphia; and a failed sojourn in Canada in 1851, from which he returned to Worcester largely on foot. The narrative closes with Mason's 1860 voyage to Haiti under Redpath's emigration program and his disillusionment with it: he documents deadly conditions among the emigrants, his own near-fatal illness, and Redpath's attempts to persuade, threaten, and bribe him into silence, before his return to publish an exposé in the Worcester newspapers describing Haiti as "a premature graveyard for the race."

== Style and themes ==
Mason's narrative was published nearly three decades after emancipation, and it reflects the concerns of the postbellum slave narrative: preserving the memory of slavery for a generation that had not experienced it, and documenting a life of accomplishment in freedom. The historian Claire Bourhis-Mariotti, in a chapter devoted to the narrative, situates it in the 1890s, when Black historians and activists sought to construct a written archive of their community's history as the country descended into institutional segregation; she argues that the book is at once a historical source for slavery and Black freedom and a deliberate act of testimony, written to preserve a record of the community's history and to vouch for the capacities, agency, dignity, and honor of Black men. She notes that while historians long distrusted antebellum slave narratives as possibly altered or shaped by abolitionist editors, Mason's postbellum account, written independently long after abolition, raises different questions of reliability and purpose.

The narrative's title signals one of its central arguments: that escape did not end Mason's bondage. As the Documenting the American South summary observes, Mason felt he had not fully escaped slavery even in the North, where the Fugitive Slave Law prevented him from settling and supporting his family until 1851 and left him continually dependent on others' goodwill for shelter and work. The summary also notes that, like his contemporary Frederick Douglass, Mason repeatedly found himself in situations that forced him to defend his manhood, physically resisting beatings from enslavers and their agents. Religious faith frames the whole account: Mason attributes his survival and escapes to God, and his sharpest moral criticism falls on the piety of enslavers, above all the preacher Mansfield.

== Publication and reception ==
The book was self-published in Worcester in 1893, with no publisher named on the title page. Hoar's prefatory endorsement lent the book the public backing of a sitting United States senator.

The narrative was digitized in 1996 by the University of North Carolina's Documenting the American South project, which includes it in its North American Slave Narratives collection, and the full text is also available through Project Gutenberg. In 2007, it was republished in a scholarly edition, From Bondage to Belonging: The Worcester Slave Narratives, edited by B. Eugene McCarthy and Thomas L. Doughton (University of Massachusetts Press), which gathers the narratives of formerly enslaved people who settled in Worcester, including Mason and Bethany Veney. The narrative is the subject of a dedicated scholarly chapter by Claire Bourhis-Mariotti in Traces and Memories of Slavery in the Atlantic World (Routledge, 2019). Mason is also the subject of an entry by Linda M. Carter in the African American National Biography (Oxford University Press, 2013), which draws substantially on the narrative.

The narrative has also served as a historical source. The Maryland State Archives used it, together with estate inventories, sale records, and an 1847 runaway advertisement, to reconstruct Mason's enslavement for its biographical series on Marylanders who fled slavery. Researchers at Washington College's Starr Center for the Study of the American Experience drew on details in the narrative, along with land deeds, wills, and newspapers, to identify the Chestertown house from which Mason escaped; the building was designated the Isaac Mason Escape Site on the National Park Service's National Underground Railroad Network to Freedom in 2025.

== Legacy and adaptations ==
In 2022, the Kent Cultural Alliance commissioned Isaac: A Musical Journey, a musical by composer Marlon Saunders based on the narrative, for the Chesapeake Heartland project; it premiered in a staged reading at Washington College. In 2025, Washington College's Miller Library acquired a first edition of the book, announcing plans to work with the Starr Center and the Kent Cultural Alliance to promote knowledge of Mason's life.
