= Breynton =

Breynton is an English surname. Famous people with this surname are:

- Rev Dr John Breynton, DD (1719–1799) - rector of St Paul's Church, Halifax, Nova Scotia during the 18th century

== Other ==
- Gypsy Breynton, fiction series of books by author Elizabeth Stuart Phelps Ward

Variants include:

- Brinton (disambiguation)
