= Beanite Quakerism =

Beanite Quakerism refers to the independent tradition of Quakerism started by Quaker ministers Joel and Hannah Bean in the western United States in the late 19th century, and in a more specific sense refers to the three Western yearly meetings that spring from that tradition.

The Beans were originally from New Hampshire, but moved to Iowa and joined the Iowa Yearly Meeting (IYM) in the late 1850s. They had not intended to start a new tradition of Quakerism, but in the 1870s and 1880s, an evangelical revival movement spread to Iowa Quakers, who by degrees abandoned traditional Quaker beliefs and practices in favor of more charismatic ones. The Beans eventually became alarmed by this phenomenon, and argued against it, but they preferred to work within IYM (Orthodox Friends) rather than splitting off as other Quakers did (forming Conservative Friends). But the new revivalist majority in IYM continued to press them, finally denouncing their views in the 1881 yearly session.

The Beans shortly moved to San Jose, California, and started a meeting there; still not wanting to break fellowship with their Yearly Meeting, they retained their membership and formed the meeting under the care of Iowa Yearly Meeting. But IYM sent two revivalist ministers to California after them, who caused a split in the meeting. The Beans and their supporters withdrew again to form another meeting, in a building they built themselves, and again applied for recognition by IYM. But IYM officially disbanded the Beans' meeting, after sending them a list of doctrinal questions to which the Beans' meeting did not give satisfactory answers, and over the next few years officially purged them as ministers and then as members.

Being forced by IYM to be on their own, the Beans thus became innovators. In 1889 they reorganized their local meeting as the College Park Association of Friends, which over the following decades became the hub of otherwise-unaffiliated Quaker meetings that appeared in the West, which later grew to be what are now known as Pacific Yearly Meeting, North Pacific Yearly Meeting, and Intermountain Yearly Meeting. Eventually Pacific Yearly Meeting and Intermountain Yearly Meeting joined Friends General Conference leaving North Pacific Yearly Meeting as the only remaining unaffiliated Yearly Meeting in the west. The three meetings jointly publish the magazine Western Friend.
