= Joel Bean =

Joel Bean (December 16, 1825 – 1914) was a Quaker minister who, along with his wife Hannah Bean, started the independent tradition of Beanite Quakerism.

== Early life ==
Bean was born in Alton, New Hampshire. His parents were John and Elizabeth Hill Bean. He attended the Friends Boarding School in Providence, Rhode Island. He moved to Iowa in 1853, and his parents joined him in 1855, and the rest of his immediate family soon after. He taught school in West Branch from 1855 to 1861. In 1858, he was recorded as a minister by the Red Cedar Monthly Meeting.

Bean met Hannah Elliot Shipley (1830–1909), from Philadelphia, Pennsylvania, during a trip she took to Iowa in 1857. They were married on June 29, 1859, at the Orange Street Meeting House in Philadelphia and settled back in West Branch.

== Career ==
The Beans traveled to Hawaii from 1861-1862 as Quaker ministers. In 1867, Joel Bean was appointed Clerk of Iowa Yearly Meeting, which he held until 1872. The Beans left Iowa from 1872-1873 to visit Quakers in England, Scotland, and Ireland. In 1875, they temporarily relocated to Providence, Rhode Island, where they enrolled their daughters and taught at the Friends Boarding School.

=== Opposition to the Revival movement ===
The Quaker revival movement emerged as part of the Holiness movement's resurgence after the American Civil War. The Beans at first had welcomed the revivalist movement, believing that it was bringing life into the Society of Friends. Bean wrote in 1874:

It is clearly apparent that the revival movement in our Society has gathered strength from year to year, until it has become a mighty current. Consciously or unconsciously, we all feel its force. The Gospel plow has been at work in these great fields, breaking up much fallow ground.

But, they saw that as the movement progressed it was departing from such Quaker ideas as the universality of the Inward light, the need for spiritual discipline and gradual growth rather than instant perfection, silent meetings for worship to wait on direct and personal guidance from God, and volunteer lay ministers and elders. The revivalists believed that people need to be "saved" and "entire sanctified", beliefs that were taught by the early Friends in some form, including George Fox. The revivalists also brought programmed worship and paid pastors into their meetings.

In 1877, the Beans returned to Iowa. Bean was appointed Clerk of the Yearly Meeting on September 5, 1877, which split two days later. Even though the Beans opposed the movement, they would not join the group of Conservative Friends who left the Iowa Yearly Meeting in opposition to it. They disliked division and did not want to be part of it; later, in an undated letter to Rufus Jones, Bean emphasized that he "never encouraged separations nor had any part in them."

Bean became more vocal in his opposition to the revivalists. In 1881, he published the popular and controversial article "The Issue" in The British Friend, in which he decried doctrines "which are preached and taught sedulously by a considerable class of our ministers."

=== College Park Association of Friends ===
In 1882, the Beans moved to San Jose, California, for the sake of Joel's health and to join other Friends there who had been a part of the Iowa Yearly Meeting. However, the controversy they sought to escape followed them. Shortly after their arrival, Bean was encouraged by Isaac Sharp to join him to visit Quakers across the United States and speak at their Meetings about his concerns. Bean's travels and his continued articles published in Friends periodicals made him a well-known opponent of the revival movement.

The Beans joined the San Jose Monthly Meeting, which had been established in 1873 under the care of the Honey Creek Monthly Meeting in Iowa. Division among the members, including Joel and Hannah Bean's insistence on traditional worship, led them to withdraw from the Meeting in 1884. Instead, they began meeting with members in what was called "the Joel Bean group," eventually building a new meetinghouse in 1885, and applied to Honey Creek Monthly Meeting to be recognized as the College Park Monthly Meeting. In a controversial decision, Honey Creek denied their application and dissolved the San Jose Monthly Meeting, but the College Park Meeting continued to meet.

In 1893, the Iowa Yearly Meeting deposed Joel and Hannah Bean as ministers and in 1898 disowned (expelled) them from membership altogether. Many Quakers in England and New England were shocked and unhappy about the Beans’ being disowned, as the Beans, in their eyes, had proven themselves devout Friends and apt ministers, and English Quaker Thomas Hodgkin organized a protest and letter of support for the Beans, signed by 410 English Quakers . The New England Yearly Meeting accepted them as members and as ministers.

In 1889, Joel and Hannah Bean helped to establish the College Park Association of Friends, which was composed of Quakers from various yearly meetings in the United States, England, and France, as well as those with no affiliations. The Association later developed into the Pacific Yearly Meeting, North Pacific Yearly Meeting, and Intermountain Yearly Meeting.

=== Death ===
Hannah Bean died in San Jose on January 31, 1909. Joel Bean's health began to fail soon after, and he returned to Hawaii, the location of his and Hannah's first missionary journey. He died in Honolulu on January 11, 1914.

== Family ==
Joel and Hannah Bean had two daughters, Lydia Bean Cox and Catharine Bean Cox.

Lydia's daughter Anna Cox Brinton was influential in the development of the Pacific Yearly Meeting from the earlier College Park Association.
