= Fred Rowntree =

English architect (1860–1927)

Frederick Rowntree
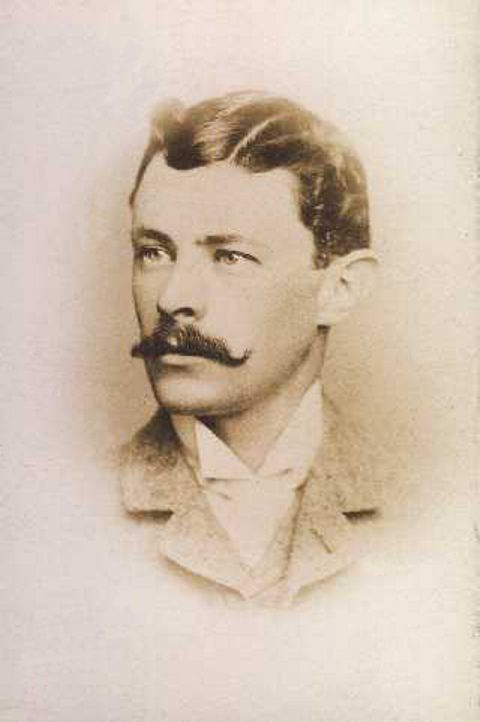
- Born: 19 April 1860; Scarborough, North Yorkshire, England
- Died: 7 January 1927 (aged 66); Hammersmith, West London, England
- Education: Bootham School
- Occupation: Architect
- Spouse: Mary Anna Gray
- Parent(s): John Rowntree; Ann Webster
- Practice: Edeson & Rowntree
- Buildings: Golders Green Quaker Meeting House, Hampstead Garden Suburb, Greater London; University College Scarborough, Scarborough, North Yorkshire
- Design: West China Union University, Chengdu, Sichuan

Frederick Rowntree (19 April 1860 Scarborough – 7 January 1927 Hammersmith) was an Arts and Crafts architect.

== Life and career ==
Rowntree was the son of John Rowntree, a master grocer and Ann Webster. His brother, John Rowntree, traded in tea and coffee. The Rowntree family were Quakers and related to Rowntree's, the well-known confectioners.

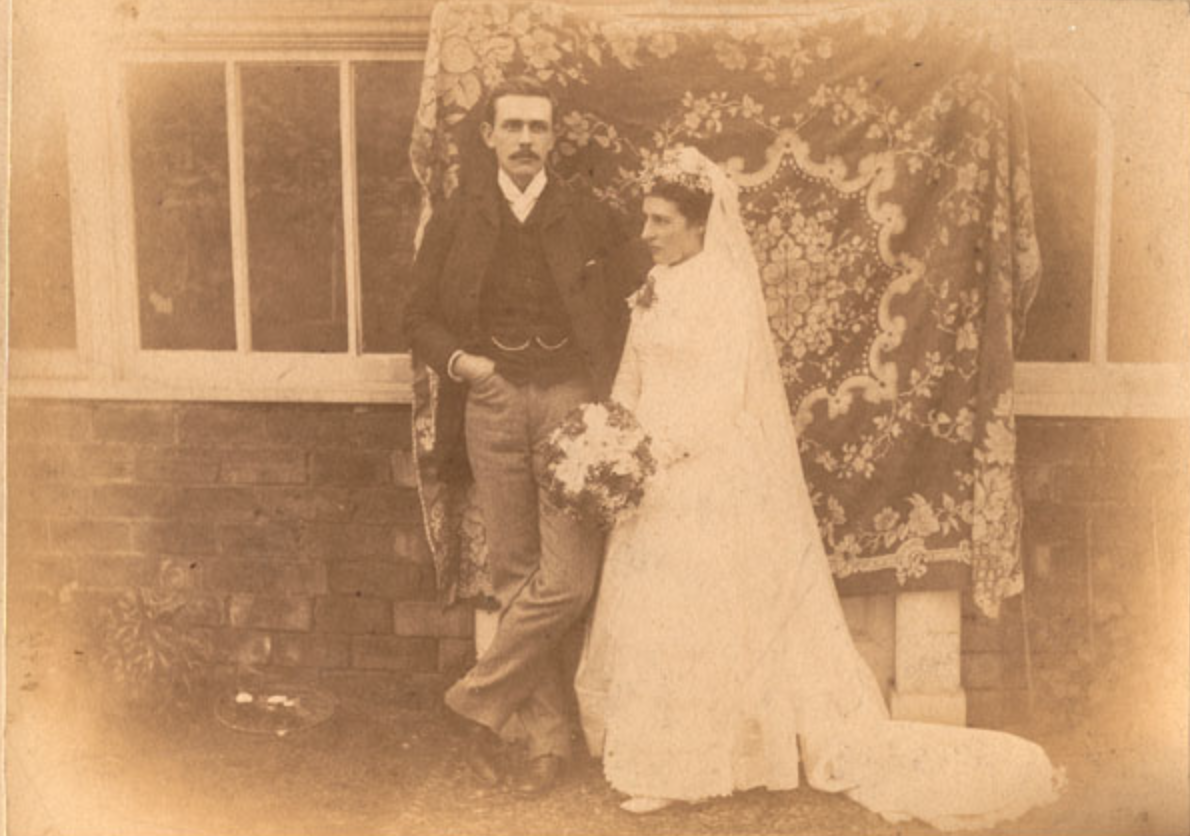
Fred Rowntree and Mary Anna Gray, on their wedding day.

Fred was a scholar at Bootham School in York, and was articled to Charles Augustus Bury of Scarborough from 1876 to 1880. He became an assistant to Edward Burgess in London and was appointed a clerk of works in Leicestershire, ending in 1885 when joined Charles Edeson of Scarborough, the company name changing to Edeson & Rowntree. On 6 October 1886 Rowntree married Mary Anna Gray (10 June 1862 – 19 July 1933), a daughter of William Gray of the biscuit manufacturers Gray, Dunn & Company, who were also Quakers. They raised a family of 5 children.

He located to London in 1890, and also entered into partnership with Malcolm Stark in Glasgow. The partnership of Stark & Rowntree dissolved in 1900, partly as a result of failing to win contracts in national competitions - the Govan District Asylum being their only significant award. Stark had consequently succumbed to alcoholism and Rowntree relocated his practice to Hammersmith.

Fred Rowntree drew his sons into his business, and was invited to tender and submit plans for the building of West China Union University in Chengtu, capital of Sichuan Province, western China. The bid of Fred Rowntree & Sons of London was successful and the firm was appointed architect to the University.

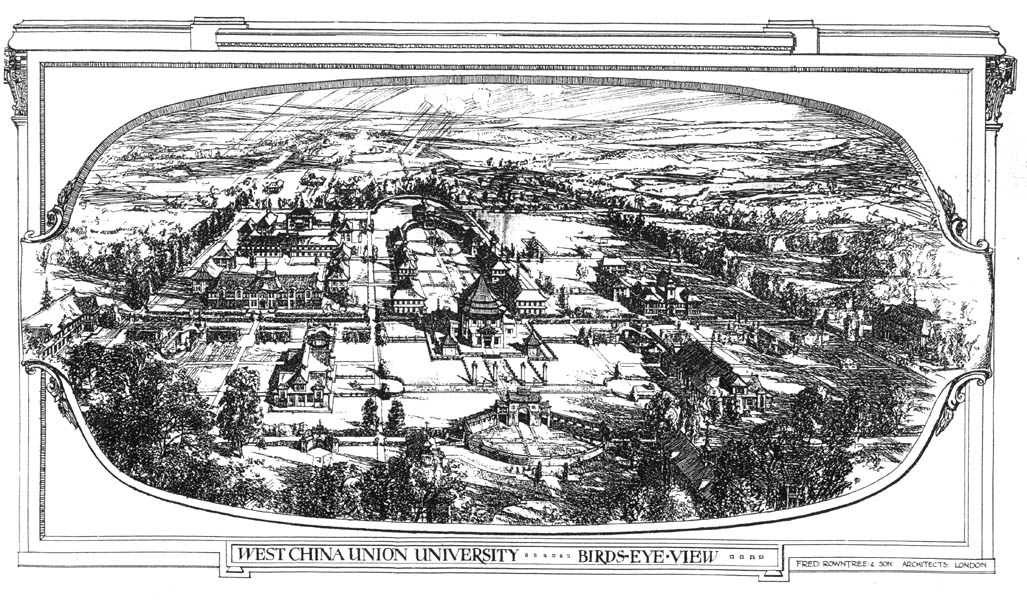
Birds-eye view of West China Union University

West China Union University had started in 1910 as a collaboration between the American Baptist Foreign Mission Society of the American Baptist Churches USA, the Board of Foreign Missions of the American Methodist Episcopal Church, the Friends' Foreign Mission Association of Great Britain and Ireland of the Britain Yearly Meeting, and the General Board of Missions of the Methodist Church of Canada (later the United Church of Canada). After a 2-year hiatus due to political unrest, the University started lectures in 1913 and initiated a program of constructing more than twenty buildings. These plans were particularly ambitious in view of the lengthy travel time from London to Chengtu.

The Rowntrees had connections in Glasgow through the Henderson family. Helen Henderson had, as her second husband, married the painter Edward Arthur Walton and through them Rowntree became acquainted with George Henry Walton, with whom he had a successful working relationship in the 1890s.

In what turned out to be his last major assignment, Fred Rowntree designed the street layout for Jordans, Buckinghamshire, and many of the properties within it, from his home and office at 11 Hammersmith Terrace in Chiswick, between 1916 and his death in 1927. His brother Douglas Rowntree lived at the property called Further Pegs in Puers Lane, Jordans, Buckinghamshire.

The building which ultimately became the home of University College Scarborough in the South Cliff area of Scarborough, was designed by Rowntree. Initially it was the Orleton preparatory school for Boys between 1910 and 1947. For most of its history the site was the North Riding Teacher Training College.

== See also ==
- Quakerism in Sichuan
