= Media Fellowship House =

The Media Fellowship House is a non-partisan interracial and interfaith organization in Media, Pennsylvania. The house has been used to hold programs for children and senior citizens and to host civics groups and civil rights activities.

== History ==
The idea for the Fellowship House began when two white women, Dorothy James and Julia Fowler, witnessed a waitress in a restaurant refuse service to two African Americans, Marie Best and her sister Ena Best. All of the women left the restaurant together and ate in another place. James and Fowler decided to create an interracial fellowship. They founded the house in 1944 in a room over a two-car garage. They used the room until 1953, when they obtained a new, larger building. In 1955, a new wing was built using money from the memorial fund for Ellen Starr Brinton.

The Fellowship House almost disbanded in 1970, but its board chose to continue its mission.
