= Taihe Subdistrict, Shehong =

Taihe Subdistrict 太和街道
- Subdistrict
- Location in Sichuan
- Coordinates: 30°51′59″N 105°22′42″E
- Country: People's Republic of China
- Province: Sichuan
- Prefecture-level city: Suining
- County-level city: Shehong
- Time zone: UTC+8 (China Standard)

Taihe Subdistrict (Chinese: 太和街道; pinyin: Tàihé Jiēdào) is a subdistrict under the administration of Shehong, Sichuan, China. As of 2020, it administers 14 residential neighborhoods and one village:

Neighborhoods

- Yashu Street Community (衙署街社区)
- Sanyuangong Community (三元宫社区)
- Desheng Street Community (德胜街社区)
- Shuihugong Community (水浒宫社区)
- Baohe Community (保河社区)
- Huangsanghao Community (黄磉浩社区)
- Jifang Street Community (机房街社区)
- Jianshe Community (建设社区)
- Hejiaqiao Community (何家桥社区)
- Fonan Community (佛南社区)
- Liangmaoshan Community (凉帽山社区)
- Wangyemiao Community (王爷庙社区)
- Nanjinggou Community (南井沟社区)
- Guixian Community (桂仙社区)

Village

- Bailianshan Village (白莲山村)
