= Shehong =

Shehong 射洪市
- County-level city
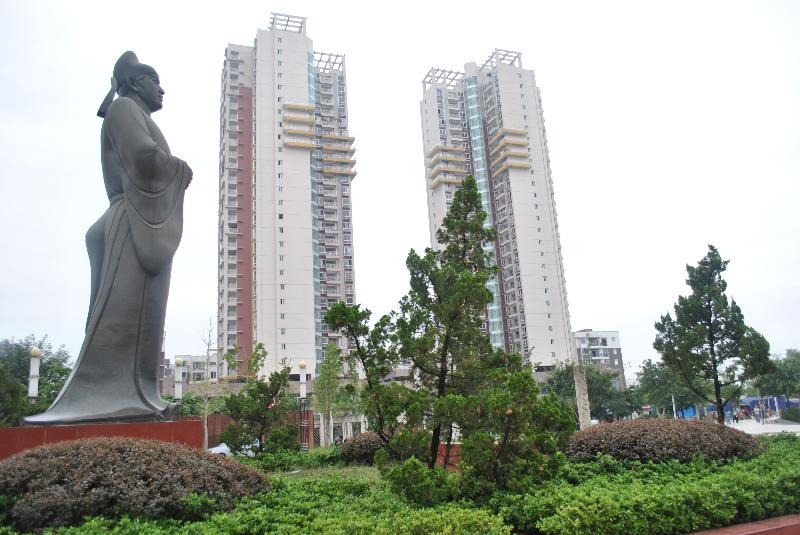

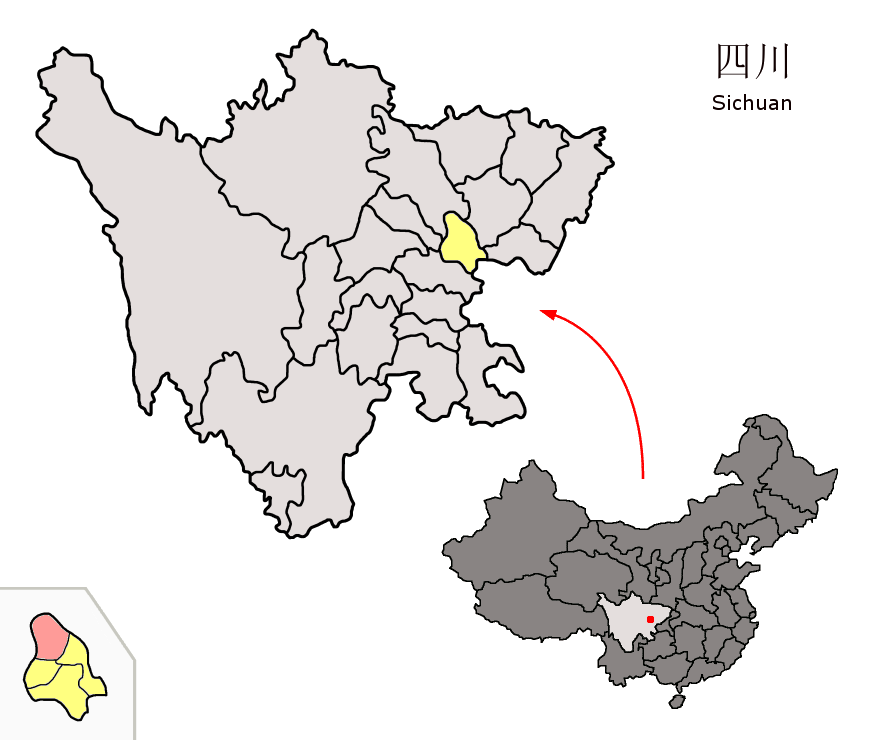
- Location of Shehong County (red) within Suining City (yellow) and Sichuan
- Coordinates: 30°52′16″N 105°23′17″E
- Country: China
- Province: Sichuan
- Prefecture-level city: Suining

Area
  - Total: 1,497 km^{2} (578 sq mi)

Population (2020 census)
  - Total: 732,380
  - Density: 489.2/km^{2} (1,267/sq mi)
- Time zone: UTC+8 (China Standard)

Shehong (Chinese: 射洪; pinyin: Shèhóng) is a county-level city in the east of Sichuan province, China, located in the central part of the Sichuan Basin. It is under the administration of the prefecture-level city of Suining.

The city seat is the town of Taihe, which itself had a population of 732,380 in 2020 census.

The Fu River flows through the city seat as well as the towns of Jinhua and Liushu, along which hydropower stations provide electricity for the county and neighboring areas.

== Administrative divisions ==
Shehong comprises 2 subdistricts and 21 towns:

subdistricts

- Taihe 太和街道
- Ping'an 平安街道

towns

- Wu'an 武安镇
- Dayu 大榆镇
- Guangxing 广兴镇
- Jinhua 金华镇
- Tuopai 沱牌镇
- Taiyi 太乙镇
- Jinjia 金家镇
- Fuxing 复兴镇
- Tianxian 天仙镇
- Renhe 仁和镇
- Qinggang 青岗镇
- Yangxi 洋溪镇
- Xiangshan 香山镇
- Mingxing 明星镇
- Fuxi 涪西镇
- Tongshe 潼射镇
- Caobei 曹碑镇
- Guansheng 官升镇
- Wensheng 文升镇
- Dongyue 东岳镇
- Quhe 瞿河镇

== Climate ==
Climate data for Shehong, elevation 383 m (1,257 ft), (1991–2020 normals, extremes 1981–present)
Month	Jan	Feb	Mar	Apr	May	Jun	Jul	Aug	Sep	Oct	Nov	Dec	Year
Record high °C (°F)	17.1 (62.8)	22.9 (73.2)	32.6 (90.7)	34.3 (93.7)	37.0 (98.6)	36.9 (98.4)	40.8 (105.4)	42.0 (107.6)	39.3 (102.7)	31.2 (88.2)	25.9 (78.6)	19.1 (66.4)	42.0 (107.6)
Mean daily maximum °C (°F)	9.9 (49.8)	13.2 (55.8)	18.7 (65.7)	24.0 (75.2)	27.7 (81.9)	29.6 (85.3)	31.9 (89.4)	32.5 (90.5)	26.5 (79.7)	21.3 (70.3)	16.5 (61.7)	11.1 (52.0)	21.9 (71.4)
Daily mean °C (°F)	6.3 (43.3)	8.9 (48.0)	13.7 (56.7)	18.3 (64.9)	22.1 (71.8)	24.8 (76.6)	26.9 (80.4)	26.9 (80.4)	22.3 (72.1)	17.6 (63.7)	12.7 (54.9)	7.7 (45.9)	17.3 (63.2)
Mean daily minimum °C (°F)	3.6 (38.5)	5.9 (42.6)	10.0 (50.0)	14.2 (57.6)	17.8 (64.0)	21.1 (70.0)	23.4 (74.1)	23.2 (73.8)	19.7 (67.5)	15.3 (59.5)	10.3 (50.5)	5.3 (41.5)	14.2 (57.5)
Record low °C (°F)	−2.7 (27.1)	−1.2 (29.8)	−1.8 (28.8)	3.6 (38.5)	7.7 (45.9)	14.2 (57.6)	17.2 (63.0)	17.5 (63.5)	12.3 (54.1)	2.2 (36.0)	1.0 (33.8)	−4.4 (24.1)	−4.4 (24.1)
Average precipitation mm (inches)	13.5 (0.53)	14.5 (0.57)	26.8 (1.06)	59.2 (2.33)	87.6 (3.45)	147.0 (5.79)	195.9 (7.71)	163.8 (6.45)	137.5 (5.41)	57.5 (2.26)	21.5 (0.85)	11.0 (0.43)	935.8 (36.84)
Average precipitation days (≥ 0.1 mm)	7.8	7.0	9.2	10.7	12.5	13.7	12.5	11.0	13.8	13.7	7.2	6.0	125.1
Average snowy days	0.8	0.3	0	0	0	0	0	0	0	0	0	0.4	1.5
Average relative humidity (%)	82	78	74	73	71	78	79	78	82	84	82	82	79
Mean monthly sunshine hours	54.8	62.6	106.4	143.8	151.6	135.1	178.9	185.0	108.2	77.1	65.5	45.8	1,314.8
Percentage possible sunshine	17	20	28	37	36	32	42	46	30	22	21	15	29
Source: China Meteorological Administrationall-time extreme temperatureall-time July high

== Education ==
Shehong has one national model secondary school, Shehong Secondary School. And three other provincial model secondary schools, Liushu Secondary School, Taihe Secondary School and Jinhua Secondary School.
