= Anna Cox Brinton =

American classics scholar, college administrator, writer and Quaker leader

- Anna Cox Brinton, from a 1934 newspaper.
- Born: Anna Shipley Cox; October 19, 1887; San Jose, California
- Died: October 28, 1969 (aged 82); Wallingford, Pennsylvania
- Occupations: classics scholar, Quaker leader
- Known for: co-director of Pendle Hill Center for Quaker Studies
- Spouse: Howard Brinton
- Children: 4; daughters Lydia, Catharine, and Joan, and son Edward Brinton

Anna Shipley Cox Brinton (October 19, 1887 – October 28, 1969) was an American classics scholar, college administrator, writer, and Quaker leader, active with the American Friends Service Committee (AFSC).

She has credited with being one of those who "reinvented Quakerism" for the 20th century.

== Early life ==
Anna Shipley Cox was born in San Jose, California, the daughter of Charles Ellwood Cox and Lydia S. Bean Cox, and the granddaughter of Quaker leaders Joel and Hannah Bean. Her father was mathematics professor at Stanford University. She attended Westtown School in Philadelphia, and completed both undergraduate work and doctoral studies at Stanford University, in 1909 and in 1917, respectively. Her sister was Catharine Cox Miles, a psychologist based at Stanford University.

== Career ==
=== Academic work ===
Brinton was a professor of archaeology and art history, on the faculty at Mills College. She was convener of the college's School of Fine Arts, and dean of the Mills College faculty. She also taught Latin and Greek and was head of the classics department at Earlham College in Indiana, from 1921 to 1928. Her dissertation project, a translation and commentary titled Maphaeus Vegius and his Thirteenth Book of the Aeneid, was published by Stanford University Press in 1930, and reissued in 2002.

Brinton prepared A Pre-Raphaelite Aeneid, which was privately published in 1934 by art collector Estelle Doheny (wife of Edward L. Doheny). She was a delegate to the Pan-Pacific Women's Conference in Hawaii in 1930. In 1931 and 1932, she held a Woodbrooke Fellowship, for advanced studies at Selly Oak College in England. She was a speaker at the Institute of World Affairs meeting in Riverside, California, in 1934.

=== American Friends Service Committee ===
Brinton was active with the AFSC for decades, serving on the organization's board from 1938 to 1965. After World War I, she went to Silesia with the organization's child feeding program. In 1931, she and her husband organized the Pacific Yearly Meeting, a west coast organization of Friends. In 1936, the Brintons were named co-directors of the Pendle Hill Quaker Center for Study and Contemplation, near Philadelphia. She was the AFSC's Commissioner for Asia from 1948. In 1952, the Brintons went to Japan with the AFSC, to direct Quaker postwar relief work in Tokyo.

In the 1960s, she was president of the Friends Historical Association. She edited a text by William Penn (No Cross, No Crown, 1945), an essay collection, Then & Now: Quaker Essays, Historical and Contemporary (1960) and a reference work, Quaker Profiles: Pictorial & Biographical 1750-1850 (1964), and wrote a biography, The Wit and Wisdom of William Bacon Evans (1964), and a history, Toward Undiscovered Ends: Friends and Russia for 300 Years (1951).

== Personal life ==
Anna Cox married writer Howard Haines Brinton in 1921. They had four children together: Lydia, the eldest; Catharine, an elementary school teacher; Joan, the youngest; and their son Edward Brinton (1924-2010) a noted oceanographer. She died from a stroke on October 28, 1969, aged 82 years, in Wallingford, Pennsylvania.

== Biographies ==
- Eleanor Price Mather, Anna Brinton: a Study in Quaker Character (1971)
- Anthony Manousos, Living the Peace Testimony: The Legacy of Howard and Anna Brinton (2004 pamphlet)
- Catharine Forbes, compiler, with Catharine Brinton Cary and Joan Brinton Erickson, A Quaker Marriage of Philosophy and Art: Words and Pictures of Howard and Anna Brinton (2012)
- Anthony Manousos, Howard and Anna Brinton: Re-Inventors of Quakerism in the Twentieth Century (2013)
