= Ellen Starr Brinton =

American pacifist, human rights activist and archivist

Ellen Starr Brinton (March, 16, 1886 - July 2, 1954) was an American pacifist, human rights activist and archivist. She represented the Women's International League for Peace and Freedom (WILPF) both locally and internationally and was known for her lectures about her working travels abroad and on the subject of peace. Brinton was the first curator of the Jane Addams Peace Collection which later became the Swarthmore College Peace Collection (SCPC). Brinton was a Quaker and a feminist.

== Career ==
Brinton was born in West Chester, Pennsylvania. She was involved in the distributions of war rations in Pennsylvania during World War I. She did publicity work for the Food Administration in Philadelphia. She also wrote for a local paper.

Brinton served as the field secretary for Pennsylvania's branch of the Women's International League for Peace and Freedom (WILPF) in the 1920s and early 1930s. In this capacity, she represented WILPF internationally. She urged WILPF to resist violence in Cuba and for the United States to stop interfering in Cuban affairs. Brinton began an inter-American project to collect the names of Latin American peace activists in 1934, eventually gaining a list of 170 names from 21 different countries. She lectured about her many travels and correspondences with international peace activists, and was considered a noted lecturer by The Philadelphia Inquirer.

Brinton started the Swarthmore College Peace Collection (SCPC) in 1935. She was first the acting curator of the collection, which contained documents belonging to Jane Addams and other sources that were around 300 years old. Brinton doubled the size of the collection, by taking relevant sources back from the Library of Congress to include in her archive for SCPC. She also found other documents belonging to Addams in 1951, which had been boxed up and placed in the Addams' barn. The special collections of peace seals and stamps were started by Brinton. Brinton retired from the library in 1951.

Brinton helped found the interracial Media Fellowship House and a wing of the house was built using money from her memorial fund.

After her death, United Nations delegates and others held a concert in her memory.
