= Pendle Hill Quaker Center for Study and Contemplation =

Coordinates: 39.908°N 75.366°W

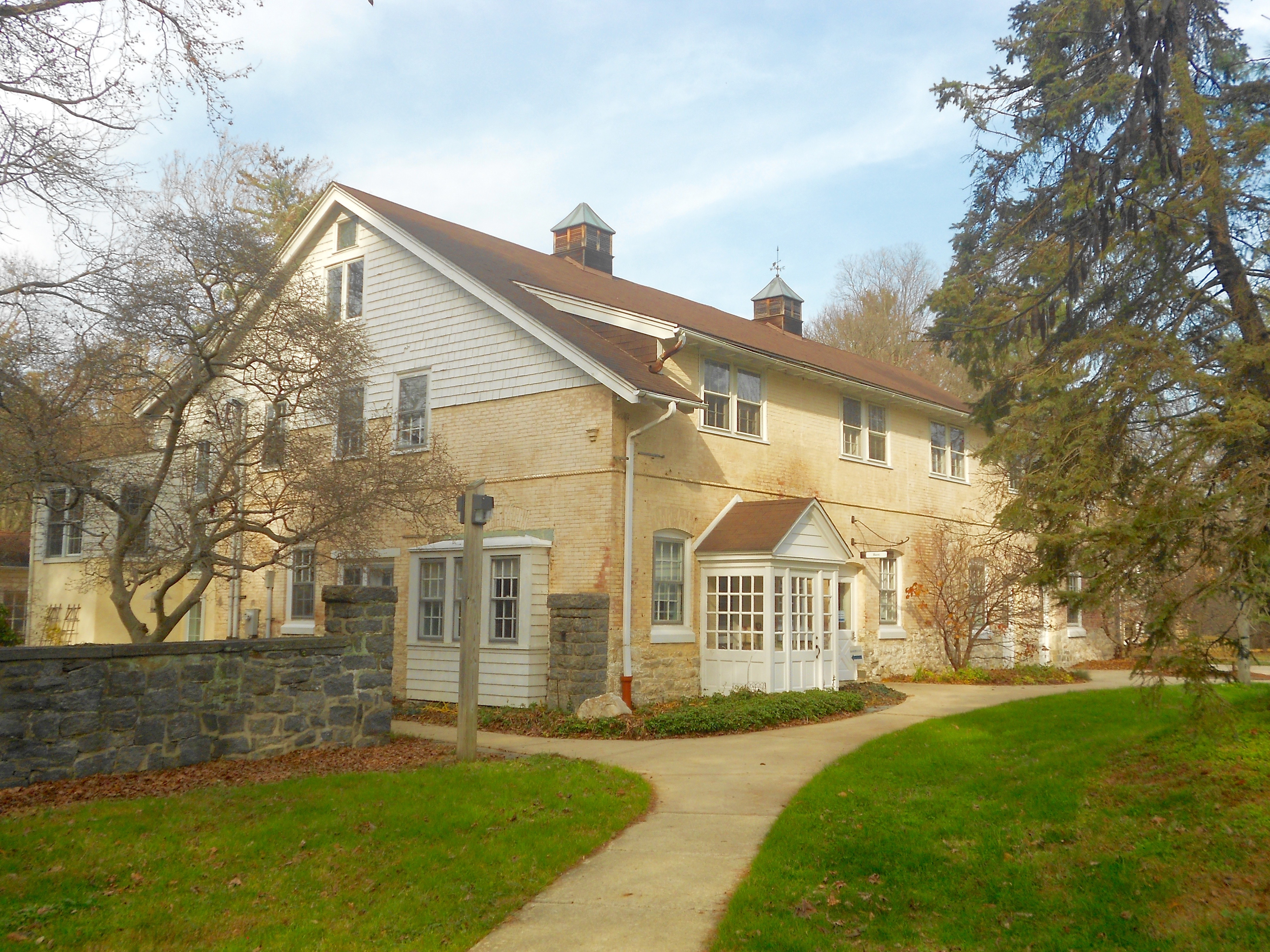
The Barn on the Pendle Hill campus

Pendle Hill is a Quaker study, retreat, and conference center located on a 24-acre (9.7 ha) campus in suburban Wallingford, Pennsylvania, near Philadelphia. It was named for Pendle Hill in Lancashire, England, that the first Quaker preacher described as the site of his calling to ministry. Founded in 1930, Pendle Hill offers programs to people of all faiths.

== Directors ==
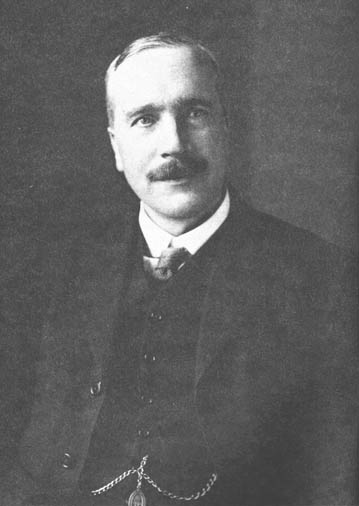
Henry Hodgkin

- Henry Theodore Hodgkin (1877–1933), director 1928–1933
- John Hughes
- Howard Brinton
- Richard Gregg
- Anna Cox Brinton & Howard Brinton
- Dan Wilson, 1952–1970
- Robert Scholz / Colin Bell, 1971–1974
- Edwin Sanders, 1974–1981
- Robert Lyon, 1981–1986
- Margery Walker, 1986–1991
- Daniel Seeger, 1991–2000
- Steve Baumgartner, 2000–2005
- Ken and Katharine Jacobsen, 2005–2007
- Lauri Perman, May 2007 – ?
- Jennifer Karsten, 2011–2019
- Traci Hjelt Sullivan (interim) 2019-2020
- Francisco Burgos 2020–present
