= Isaac Mason =

American abolitionist and slave narrative author (1822–1898)

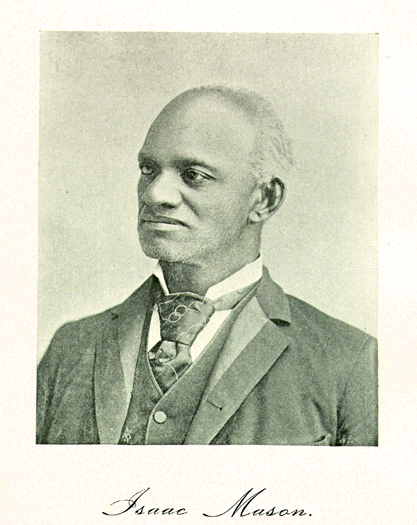
- Mason depicted in the frontispiece of his 1893 autobiography Life of Isaac Mason as a Slave
- Born: May 14, 1822; Georgetown Cross Roads (now Galena, Maryland), Kent County, Maryland, U.S.
- Died: August 28, 1898 (aged 76)
- Occupations: Farmer, community leader, author
- Known for: Life of Isaac Mason as a Slave (1893)
- Spouse: Annie Mason (m. 1849)
- Children: 2

Isaac Mason (May 14, 1822 – August 28, 1898) was an American abolitionist, community leader, and author of the slave narrative Life of Isaac Mason as a Slave (1893). Born enslaved in Kent County, Maryland, under the name William ("Will") Thompson, Mason escaped in December 1846 and eventually settled in Worcester, Massachusetts, where he was one of the city's most prominent African American citizens for nearly five decades. He was active in the anti-slavery movement, the Republican Party, and the African Methodist Episcopal Zion Church, and participated in James Redpath's Haitian emigration program in 1860 before returning to publicly denounce it. His autobiography, self-published in Worcester in 1893, is among the most detailed firsthand accounts of slavery in nineteenth-century Maryland. In 2025, the Chestertown, Maryland, house from which Mason escaped was designated a site on the National Park Service's National Underground Railroad Network to Freedom.

== Early life ==
Mason was born on May 14, 1822, in Georgetown Cross Roads (rendered "George Town Cross Oats" in his narrative), a village in Kent County, Maryland, now known as Galena. He was the eldest of five children — four sons and one daughter — born to Zekiel (Ezekiel) Thompson, a free Black man, and Sophia Thompson, who was enslaved by Hannah Woodland and worked as a house servant; his younger brother William Anderson later also settled in Worcester. Because his mother was enslaved, Mason was legally Woodland's property from birth. His father worked on one of the two farms Woodland owned, serving as overseer of the farmhands, likely to remain near his wife. Mason's maternal grandfather, Richard Graham Grimes, had charge of the farm's operations. During his enslavement Mason was known as Will; he took the name Isaac Mason after his escape.

== Enslavement ==
=== Hannah Woodland ===
From the age of five or six, Mason served as Woodland's personal servant, performing housework, running errands, accompanying her as a page when she drove out, and sleeping on a truckle bed in her chamber so that he could be summoned at any hour. He remained in this role until 1837, when Woodland, then about ninety, died of a stroke of paralysis; Mason, about fifteen, had accompanied her on a farm visit that same day.

Woodland's estate was settled by her son-in-law, Hugh Wallace of Morgan's Creek. The farm was sold to a buyer named Isaac Taylor, and Mason's grandfather, considered past the age of useful labor, was freed and given an old horse and cart. In the estate inventory Mason is listed under the name "Bill," valued at $200; a list of additional sales records his sale to James Mansfield Jr. for $250. Mason's father arranged to purchase his wife and infant daughter for $600, with a local physician, Dr. Hyde, standing as security for the debt.

=== Dr. Hyde ===
To pay a $25 debt owed by the estate, Mason was hired out to Hyde, who lived in Georgetown Cross Roads. According to his narrative, Mason cooked, washed, tended the garden and animals, and was whipped daily and denied a meal each day as "interest" on the debt. His time with the Hydes ended during Christmas week, when Hyde's wife locked him in the kitchen and beat him for going rabbit hunting; Mason wrested the switches from her, knocked her down, and escaped through a window, hiding in a barn before fleeing to his mother's and then his grandfather's home.

Enraged, Hyde demanded immediate payment of the $600 for which he stood security. Mason's mother fled to Baltimore with her infant daughter, where a Quaker furnished $400 of the sum in exchange for a bill of sale binding the daughter to his family until age eighteen (she was released at sixteen); Mason's father, who had paid $200 down, later emancipated both, and mother and daughter became legally free.

=== The Mansfield household in Chestertown ===
Following instructions from Hugh Wallace, Mason was delivered on New Year's Eve, by way of his uncle Joe Grimes, to James Mansfield Jr. in Chestertown, the Kent County seat. Mansfield was a cabinetmaker who had bought out his father's business and also worked as the town's undertaker; he lived with his wife Mary and two young children.

After about four weeks, Mary Mansfield beat Mason with a cowhide whip so severely that he was unable to work; his narrative records that he could not stand the next morning from loss of blood. Thereafter, at his wife's insistence, Mansfield whipped Mason weekly in the cellar, stripped and bound, until Mansfield himself became disgusted and refused to continue.

Mason was then transferred to work a sixty-acre farm Mansfield had purchased about a mile outside Chestertown. Over five years he raised its yield from five or six bushels of corn and wheat per acre to thirty, and managed the farm himself for the last three years. He also drove Mansfield's hearse, attending the funerals of prominent residents within a twenty-mile radius, sometimes traveling two days alone with a coffin. During a trip to Baltimore in 1845 to sell grain, Mason was beaten bloody by two white men on Pratt Street for walking between them on the sidewalk, an act forbidden to Black Marylanders under local custom.

In August 1846, the household's supply of beef spoiled. The enslaved workers were ordered to eat it anyway; Mason, unable to, fed his portion to a dog and was reported by the housekeeper, a daughter of Hugh Wallace, for "impudence." When Mansfield confronted Mason and began beating him with a stick, Mason fought back and pushed him over a woodpile; Mansfield called for his gun and fired three shots at Mason as he fled, grazing his scalp and ear and passing through his hat. Mason hid overnight in a mulberry thicket, reflecting in his narrative on the contradiction between Mansfield's violence and his standing as a local Methodist preacher and Mason's own class leader. In the following weeks, Wallace twice attempted to whip Mason himself, once breaking a pitchfork over his shoulders, prompting a night flight during which Mason nearly drowned crossing a creek.

In December 1846, Mansfield's son warned Mason that his father had agreed to trade him to Wallace in exchange for a twenty-two-year-old enslaved man named George plus $300, and that Wallace intended to send Mason to a nephew in New Orleans, a slave trader, in January.

== Escape ==
Mason resolved to escape. He hired a horse from a free Black man, Jim Willmer, for a bushel of oats and rode by night to Georgetown Cross Roads to enlist Joe Brown, a Black man he had known since childhood, who agreed to guide a party of three to Philadelphia for nine dollars. Mason recruited Joshua, another man enslaved by Mansfield, and George, the man intended to replace him. On the night of Saturday, December 26, 1846, during the Christmas holidays when enslaved people were customarily permitted to visit family, the three fled Chestertown.

After a rendezvous with Brown at Price's Woods, where the four knelt in the snow, prayed, and swore an oath to fight for one another until death, the party set out on foot for Wilmington, Delaware, some thirty-five miles away. Warned that a gang of "body-snatchers" was watching a bridge on the main road, they detoured, and spent a day hiding under a fallen oak in a Delaware forest while a fox hunt of some fifty white riders swept the woods around them. Mason's companions, terrified, resolved to turn back; Mason navigated onward by the North Star until the party was met by Brown and a new guide, Perry Augustus. They passed Wilmington at midnight and crossed the Delaware–Pennsylvania line at about three o'clock in the morning, where Mason knelt with the others on the snow-covered ground in thanksgiving, a moment he described as stepping "from bondage into liberty, from darkness into light." The group rested at New Garden, Pennsylvania, in the home of Nelson Wiggins, before continuing to Philadelphia.

In January 1847, Mansfield published a runaway advertisement in the Kent News offering a $200 reward for "Bill Thompson" and "Josh Woodland."

== Life in the North ==
Mason found farm work in Chester County, Pennsylvania — first at Doe Run with the farmer James Pile at four dollars a month, later with other farmers at rising wages — and by 1849 had negotiated an arrangement with Joshua Pusey that included a house and two acres of land, in anticipation of his marriage. The plan collapsed when a neighbor, Tom Mitchell, a fellow runaway from Kent County, was seized by Maryland slave catchers; local Quakers later raised $500 to purchase Mitchell's freedom and bring him back. Alarmed, Mason moved to Philadelphia and worked as a hod carrier, returning to Chester County in September 1849 to marry Annie (maiden name unknown); the couple settled in Philadelphia.

After the passage of the Fugitive Slave Act of 1850, which required officials and citizens of free states to assist in capturing escaped enslaved people, Mason spotted one of Hugh Wallace's sons from a ladder while at work; through the lawyer Paul Brown, Philadelphia's Black leaders learned that Wallace's son was in the city hunting his father's runaways. Advised to leave for Massachusetts, the Masons sold their household goods and traveled by way of New York, assisted by a Black Underground Railroad agent named Gibbs, to Boston, where they stayed with the abolitionist Lewis Hayden. Unable to find work in Boston, Mason was sent by William Cooper Nell, an agent of the Anti-Slavery Society, to Worcester with letters of introduction, where he lodged with Ebenezer Hemenway and found steady work on Major Newton's farm on Pleasant Street.

In the spring of 1851, with slave catchers active in Massachusetts, Mason was advised to flee to Canada. He rented rooms and brought his wife to Worcester, then departed on April 15, 1851, with two companions for Montreal. Finding no work there, in Kingston, or in Toronto, where the men were twice cheated of their wages, and learning by letter that his wife was ill, Mason worked his passage by steamboat to Rochester, New York, and made his way home largely on foot, at one point walking seventy-five miles overnight along the railroad. Near Utica, riding a canal-boat horse, he passed under a bridge and recognized Mansfield looking down at him; unrecognized in return, Mason abandoned the boat and fled. He reached Worcester on July 2, 1851, and made the city his permanent home. The Masons' first child, Eliza Jane, was born in 1851, and a second child, Samuel, around 1854.

== Haitian emigration ==
In 1859, the Scottish-American abolitionist James Redpath began recruiting African Americans to emigrate to Haiti, arranging free passage and sixteen days of provisions on arrival. Mason, hoping to improve his economic condition, wrote to Redpath insisting on paying his own expenses, and sailed from Boston's Liverpool Wharf on May 14, 1860, aboard the schooner Pearl with seventy-five emigrants; a young woman died during a gale on the first night of the voyage.

Mason quickly became disillusioned. He recorded a death rate of three to four people per day among the roughly five hundred emigrants settled at St. Marc, and himself nearly died of illness, crediting his recovery to a Haitian woman who treated him with an infusion of orange peel. Concluding that the program was "false and evil to the race," Mason resolved to expose it; Redpath attempted to persuade, threaten, and finally bribe him into silence. Mason returned to Boston at the end of August 1860, carrying 325 letters from emigrants to their families, which he forwarded through the Worcester post office, and published an exposé in the Worcester daily newspapers describing Haiti as "a premature graveyard for the race" and asserting that two-thirds of the five thousand emigrants under the Redpath scheme had died of disease.

== Later life and death ==
Over the years Mason worked as a janitor in various Worcester municipal buildings. For nearly five decades he was among Worcester's most prominent African American citizens. He was active in the anti-slavery movement, the Republican Party, and the African Methodist Episcopal Zion Church, and belonged to two fraternal organizations: the Prince Hall Masons, as a member of King David Lodge No. 16, and the Odd Fellows. After the Civil War, no longer at risk as a fugitive, Mason returned to Kent County, Maryland, in 1866 as part of a church delegation led by Reverend G. W. Offley that assisted formerly enslaved people.

Mason published his autobiography, Life of Isaac Mason as a Slave, in Worcester in 1893, with a commendatory note from Senator George Frisbie Hoar, for whom Mason had worked since 1850. He died on August 28, 1898.

== Life of Isaac Mason as a Slave ==
Mason's autobiography, self-published in 1893, recounts his enslavement in Maryland, his 1846 escape, his years as a fugitive in the North, and his experience of the Haitian emigration program. It belongs to a group of postbellum slave narratives published by formerly enslaved residents of Worcester, collected in the scholarly edition From Bondage to Belonging: The Worcester Slave Narratives (2007).

== Legacy ==
The full text of Mason's narrative was digitized by the University of North Carolina's Documenting the American South project in 1996 and is also available through Project Gutenberg. The Maryland State Archives includes Mason in its biographical series on Marylanders who fled slavery, drawing on estate inventories, sale records, and the 1847 runaway advertisement to corroborate his account.

In 2022, the Kent Cultural Alliance commissioned Isaac: A Musical Journey, a musical work based on Mason's life by composer Marlon Saunders, for the Chesapeake Heartland project.

Beginning around 2007, undergraduate researchers at Washington College's Starr Center for the Study of the American Experience worked to identify the site of Mason's enslavement and escape; using land deeds, wills, newspapers, state archival records, and details from Mason's narrative, the research team identified the former Mansfield home at 101 Spring Avenue in Chestertown, a building constructed in 1799 and moved one lot west around 1900, which now houses the Kent Cultural Alliance. Researchers also located the probable site of Mason's birthplace near Galena, found his unmarked grave in Massachusetts, and traced living descendants. In May 2025, the National Park Service designated the building the Isaac Mason Escape Site, part of the National Underground Railroad Network to Freedom, and a marker was dedicated in a public ceremony attended by Mason's descendants on November 13, 2025. Washington College's Miller Library acquired a first edition of the narrative in 2025.
