= Howard Brinton =

American philosopher and educator (1884–1973)

Howard Haines Brinton (1884–1973) was an author, professor and director whose work influenced the Religious Society of Friends movement for much of the 20th century. His books ranged from Quaker journal anthologies to philosophical and historical dissertations on the faith, establishing him as a prominent commentator on the Society of Friends.

== Early life ==
Howard Brinton was born on July 24, 1884, in West Chester, Pennsylvania, to a Quaker couple, who were from different strands of the Quaker faith: his father Orthodox and his mother Hicksite.

== Academic career ==
He studied at Haverford College with Rufus Jones and graduated in 1905, obtaining a master's degree (Math and Physics) in 1906. He taught at Olney Friends School in Barnesville, Ohio, and at Pickering College in New Market, Ontario. In 1909, he obtained a master's degree in philosophy from Harvard.

In 1916, Howard Brinton was appointed acting President of Guilford College, North Carolina, at a troubled time for the college. He visited conscientious objectors imprisoned at Camp Jackson, South Carolina, who were not permitted to communicate with outside and whose location was not known to their relatives and friends.

== AFSC ==
This visit inspired him to join, in 1919, the American Friends Service Committee soon after, which allowed Quakers and other pacifists to serve during wartime in nonviolent means. It also co-ordinated relief to the victims of war.

The chaotic consequences of war, that he witnessed in Upper Silesia influenced his work as a pacifist speaker and writer in the 1920s and 1930s. It was during this period that he met Anna Shipley Cox (19 October 1887 - 28 October 1969), who also worked in Europe for AFSC. They married when he returned to the United States on July 25, 1921.

== Academic career (continued) ==
In 1925, he obtained a doctorate in philosophy from the University of California, while Anna taught at Mills College. Then they moved to Earlham College in Richmond, Indiana, where both taught and their first three children were born. In 1929, they returned to California, where their fourth child was born and both taught at Mills. During this period he became involved in the case of Thomas Mooney and Warren Billings.

In 1931, they spent a year in England at Woodbrooke Quaker College in Birmingham. In that year, Howard gave the Swarthmore Lecture at London Yearly Meeting, with the title Creative Worship.

== Pendle Hill ==
In 1936, Howard and Anna Cox Brinton became co-directors at the Pendle Hill religious center in Wallingford, Pennsylvania.

A pen portrait of Pendle Hill in the Brinton period appeared in Time magazine June 21, 1948. The article indicates the diversity of the students and the variety of their studies.

Brinton used this opportunity to produce over a dozen books and pamphlets dealing with Quakerism. Ironically, one of his most productive writing periods came during World War II, during which he published the widely used A Guide to Quaker Practice. One of his later works, Friends for 300 Years, was cited by Elizabeth Vining as "one of the great Quaker books of all time".

== Japan and later years ==
In 1949, Anna Brinton left Pendle Hill to work with AFSC. Howard continued until 1952, when he retired and the couple moved to Japan, in AFSC service. They returned to Pendle Hill in 1954. Howard's Japanese secretary, Yuki Takahashi, a widow, returned with them to help her employer write his memoirs, which have never been published. In May 1972, the nearly blind and aged Brinton, having obtained consent from his adult children, surprised everyone by marrying Takahashi.

Howard Brinton died on April 9, 1973.

== Publications ==
incomplete list

- A Religious Solution to the Social Problem (1934)
- Quaker Education in Theory and Practice (1940)
- Guide to Quaker Practice (1943)
- The Society of Friends (1948)
- Friends for 300 years (1952)

=== Pendle Hill pamphlets by Howard Brinton ===
- A Religious Solution To The Social Problem by Howard Brinton, Pendle Hill pamphlet #2
- The Quaker Doctrine of Inward Peace by Howard Brinton, Pendle Hill pamphlet #44
- The Nature of Quakerism by Howard Brinton, Pendle Hill pamphlet #47
- The Society of Friends by Howard Brinton, Pendle Hill pamphlet #48
- Prophetic Ministry by Howard Brinton, Pendle Hill pamphlet #54
- Reaching Decisions by Howard Brinton, Pendle Hill pamphlet #65
- How They Became Friends by Howard Brinton, Pendle Hill pamphlet #144
