= Pacific Yearly Meeting =

Quaker gathering

Pacific Yearly Meeting is an FGC-affiliated yearly meeting of the Religious Society of Friends or Quakers. It gathered for the first time in Palo Alto, California, during the summer of 1947 with twelve member Monthly Meetings. Geographically the original area served by Pacific Yearly Meeting included British Columbia, Washington, Oregon, California, Nevada, Hawaii, Guatemala and Mexico, with connections to Friends in Korea, Japan and China (Shanghai and Hong Kong). In 1973 British Columbia withdrew from PYM to align with Canadian Yearly Meeting. Two new Yearly Meetings were created out of sections of the original PYM: North Pacific Yearly Meeting in 1973 and Intermountain Yearly Meeting in 1975.

It now consists of 55-56 unprogrammed meetings or smaller worship groups in California (44-45), Hawaii (8), Nevada (2), and Mexico City (1). The northern California/Nevada meetings (34) are in the College Park Quarterly Meeting and southern California/Nevada meetings (17) are in the Southern California Quarterly Meeting which meet every three or six months for Worship for Business.
