= Church of the East in Sichuan =

Historical religion in Sichuan

- 四川景教
- Type: Eastern Christian
- Orientation: Syriac Christianity
- Scripture: Syriac Bible
- Theology: East Syriac theology: dyophysite doctrine of Theodore of Mopsuestia (wrongly referred as Nestorianism)
- Polity: Episcopal
- Region: Tang-era Yizhou; Yuan-era Sichuan
- Language: Syriac; Old Sichuanese
- Liturgy: East Syriac Rite
- Origin: 7th century
- Branched from: Church of the East

The exact date of the entry of the Syriac Church of the East (or "Nestorian Church") into modern-day Sichuan province is not clear, but probably occurred in the 7th century not long after the arrival of Alopen in the Tang capital Chang'an in 635. The provincial capital Chengdu is the only inland city in the southwest where a Christian presence can be confirmed in the time of the Tang dynasty (618–907). Two monasteries have also been located in Chengdu and Mount Omei. David Crockett Graham noted that Marco Polo found East Syriac monasteries in Sichuan and Yunnan in the 13th century.

== Evidence of East Syriac Church in Sichuan ==
=== Pearl Temple ===
According to the 12th-century biji collection Loose Records from the Studio of Possible Change by Wu Zeng, during the Tang dynasty, "Hu" missionaries built a Daqin temple (i.e., an East Syriac church) into the existing ruins of the former Castle of Seven Treasures (Note: Castle of Seven Treasures (traditional Chinese: 七寶樓; simplified Chinese: 七宝楼; pinyin: Qībǎo lóu; Sichuanese romanization: Ts'ie^{5} Pao^{3} Leo^{2})) at Chengdu, which was constructed by ancient Shu kings of the Kaiming dynasty (666 BC – 316 BC) and had pearl curtains installed as decorative applications. It was later destroyed by the Great Fire of Shu Commandery during the reign of Emperor Wu of Han (141 BC – 87 BC). The temple consisted of a gatehouse, halls and towers, just like the former castle, and its doors and windows were decorated with curtains made of gold, pearls and green jasper, prompting it to be known as the Pearl Temple. (Note: Pearl Temple (traditional Chinese: 珍珠樓; simplified Chinese: 珍珠楼; archaic form: 眞珠樓 or 真珠樓; pinyin: Zhēnzhū lóu; Sichuanese romanization: Chen^{1} Chu^{1} Leo^{2})) In volume 2 of A Detailed Account of the Shu Province (Note: Shu is the archaic name for Sichuan.) by Cao Xuequan (1575–1646), it is recorded that "the foundation of the Pearl Temple was on Shisun Street. (Note: Shisun Street (traditional Chinese: 石筍街; simplified Chinese: 石笋街; pinyin: Shísǔn Jiē; Sichuanese romanization: Shï^{5} Sen^{3} Kai^{1}; lit. 'Stalagmite Street')) The temple was built by the 'Hu' people from Daqin, which was made up of halls and other spaces and decorated with pearls and green jasper."

The ruins of Pearl Temple are the subject of Du Fu's poem "The Stone Shoots: A Ballad": (Note: Original title in traditional Chinese: 石筍行; simplified Chinese: 石笋行; pinyin: Shísǔn xíng; Sichuanese romanization: Shï^{5} Sen^{3} Shin^{2}; lit. 'Stalagmites: A Ballad'. English translation published in The Poetry of Du Fu, Volume 3.) "Have you not seen by the west gate of Yizhou City, (Note: Yizhou City (Sichuanese romanization: Icheo Ch'en; lit. 'City of Yi Prefecture') was the name of Chengdu during the Tang dynasty.) by a field lane the 'Stone Shoots,' (Note: These were a pair of dolmens outside of Chengdu. According to Chang Qu's Chronicles of Huayang, they served as tomb markers for the kings of Ancient Shu.) a pair crouching high. Since ancient times it's been said that these were 'eyes of the sea,' (Note: Springs that connect directly with the ocean underground.) mosses and lichens have eaten away all traces of waves and billows. In heavy rains one often finds rare green gems—these things are a muddle and hard to explain clearly." He was unaware of the site being the ruins of a church, for he went on to write: "I suspect that in olden days these were tombs of a minister or grandee, they set the stones up as markers, and they still survive today." According to volume 7 of Du Gongbu's Poems Annotated by Thousand Scholars, (Note: Du Gongbu's Poems Annotated by Thousand Scholars (traditional Chinese: 集千家註杜工部詩集; simplified Chinese: 集千家注杜工部诗集; pinyin: Jí qiānjiā zhù Dù Gōngbù shījí)) Pearl Temple was "later destroyed and fell to the ground, but the foundation remained. Pearls, gold and green gems were often found in the ruins after heavy rains." The Illustrated Chorography of Shu (Note: Illustrated Chorography of Shu (traditional Chinese: 蜀圖經; simplified Chinese: 蜀图经; pinyin: Shǔ Tújīng; Sichuanese romanization: Shu^{5} Tu^{2} Chin^{1})) states that its destruction was brought about by a military conflict. Zhao Bian's Stories of Shu Commandery (Note: Stories of Shu Commandery (Chinese: 蜀郡故事; pinyin: Shǔjùn gùshì; Sichuanese romanization: Shu^{5} Chüin^{4} Ku^{4} Sï^{4})) (11th century) also mentions the temple: "The Daqin empire, whence a variety of precious stones is obtained, namely, lapis lazuli, emeralds, pearls, and luminous jade. Its waterways lead to Yi Prefecture and Yongchang Commandery, wherefore the temple was built by people from Daqin."

Du Gongbu stayed in Yizhou during the reigns of the emperors Suzong and Daizong (756–779). In light of the fact that Pearl Temple had already been destroyed when "The Stone Shoots: A Ballad" was written, it can be speculated that the construction of the temple was no later than the Xuanzong period (712–756).

=== Ciqikou crosses ===
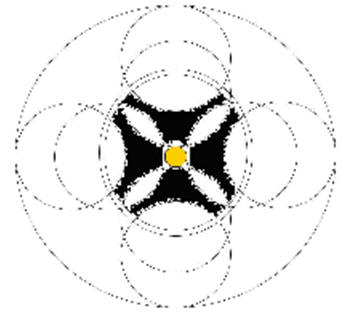
One of the Ciqikou crosses

In 2011, a pilgrim cross and several crosses of Syrian design were identified by the Syriac Orthodox priest Dale Albert Johnson in Ciqikou, Chongqing, dated to the 9th century. These are substantially similar to Syriac crosses found in Tur Abdin, Turkey (in the 8th–9th century), Aleppo, Syria (in the 6th century), and the Uyghur region of Xinjiang, China (in the 14th century). The symbol consists of a cross embedded in a circle. The arms of the cross are leaf-shaped and at the centre of the cross is a circle. The inner arch of each circle has a lobe-shaped design at its edge. The rest are crosses within Bodhi leaves carved on a round granite stone base, now in front of an antique shop on a back-street in Ciqikou. According to Johnson, crosses within Bodhi leaves (heart shape or spade designs) are Persian crosses, associated with the Syrian Christians of India.

=== East Syriac tradition in Hanchow ===
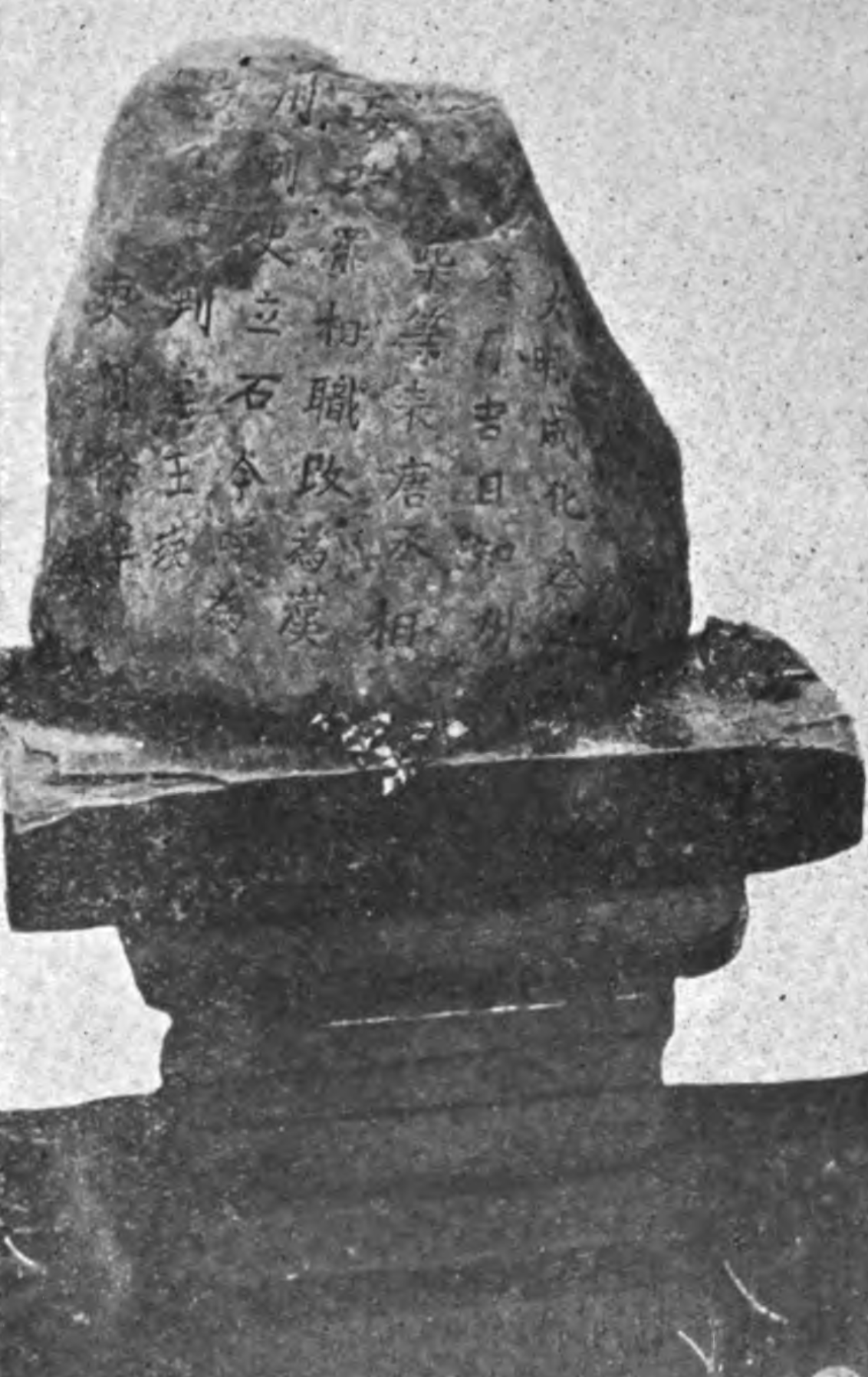
Duke Fang Stone

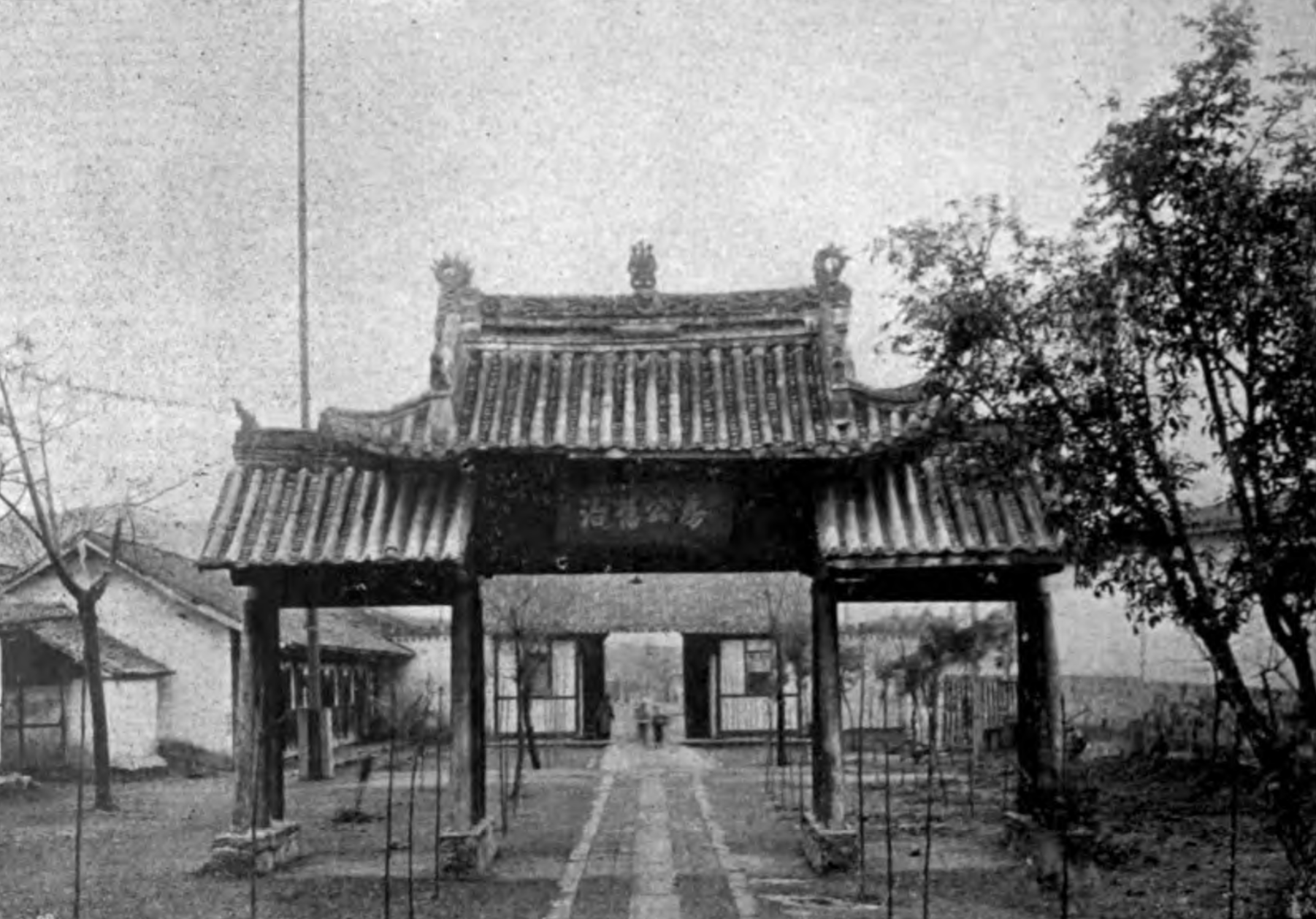
Memorial arch of Fang Kuan within the yamen

The origin of the East Syriac tradition in Hanchow (Note: Hanchow (traditional Chinese: 漢州; simplified Chinese: 汉州; Sichuanese romanization: Han^{4} Cheo^{1}; lit. 'Han Prefecture'), modern-day Guanghan.) was researched and recorded by Vyvyan Donnithorne in the early 1930s. The tradition says that Fang Kuan, the prefect of Hanchow from 760 to 762, was a Christian. He built an altar in the second court of the yamen, upon which he placed a pillar, or a stone, and to this sacred place he used to go everyday and worshipped the One God alone. At his daily worship, Fang used to kneel on the stone which later came to be known as Duke Fang Stone. This altar was enclosed on all sides and only Fang Kuan himself was allowed access to it. By his justice and benevolence and loving government he was respected long after his death, even until the time of Donnithorne. In consequence this altar became a place of pilgrimage, where worship was performed for hundreds of years after his death. According to local testimonies, Fang Kuan's name was carved on the no-longer-extant Nestorian stele at Wang Hsiang T'ai Temple. The stele was broken into several pieces for use in building a bridge before Donnithorne could lay his eyes on it. The earlier name for Wang Hsiang T'ai Temple was Ching Fu Yuan, and Ching Fu (Note: Ching Fu (Chinese: 景福) is a term inscribed on the Nestorian Tablet of Chang'an in the sentence 法流十道, 國富元休; 寺滿百城, 家殷景福 which P. Y. Saeki translated: "The Law of the Luminous Religion spread throughout the ten provinces, and the Empire enjoyed great peace and concord. Monasteries were built in many cities, whilst every family enjoyed the great blessings of Salvation.") is a term with the meaning "Blessings of Christianity".

=== A Christian ophthalmologist in Chengdu ===
A report by the 9th-century writer Li Weigong included in A Complete Collection of Tang-era Prose Literature states that a certain Daqin cleric proficient in ophthalmology or optometry was present in the Chengdu area. In volume 12 of The Collected Works of Li Weigong, (Note: The Collected Works of Li Weigong (traditional Chinese: 李衛公文集; simplified Chinese: 李卫公文集; pinyin: Lǐ Wèigōng wénjí)) it is recorded that in 829, Wang Cuodian, a powerful official of the Kingdom of Nanzhao (modern-day Yunnan), "led his troops to attack Shu and returned with much plunder." The next year, Li Weigong as the Metropolitan Magistrate of Chengdu Prefecture, "sent officials to the 'barbarians' (i.e., the Yunnanese), went through the prefectures and counties, and searched one by one, and got their names, which were all recorded. [...] The 'barbarians' captured a total of 9,000 people, 8,000 of these were from the attached counties of Chengdu and Huayang. Among whom there were a female musician (or actress), two zaju actors, and a Daqin monk specialized in eye diseases. The rest were ordinary people." Zhang Xushan speculated that this Christian physician "might not have been alone, but a member of an East Syriac community in Chengdu." Moreover, "this community was likely to flee to Nanzhao during the Huichang persecution of Buddhism (841–845) which was also directed against Christians." Duan Yuming also quoted Xu Jiarui in his 1993 article: "This is how East Syriac Christians entered Yunnan from Sichuan."

=== Persian Li family of Zizhou ===
A Persian family of Zizhou (Note: Zizhou (Chinese: 梓州; Sichuanese romanization: Tsï^{3} Cheo^{1}; lit. 'Zi Prefecture'), in modern-day Santai County.) with the adopted surname Li flourished during the time of the Kingdom of Former Shu (907–925). The two brothers, Li Xun and Li Xuan, were accomplished physicians and pharmacologists. The former was the author of Overseas Pharmacopoeia (Note: Overseas Pharmacopoeia (traditional Chinese: 海藥本草; simplified Chinese: 海药本草; pinyin: Hǎiyào Běncǎo; Sichuanese romanization: Hai^{3} Io^{5} Pen^{3} Ts'ao^{3})) and also a poet. Li Shunxian, their younger sister, was a painter, poet and a concubine of Wang Zongyan, emperor of Former Shu. Their religious background has been suggested as Zoroastrian or Nestorian Christian by Li Guotao and Lo Hsiang-lin, respectively. Li believed that the mention of Weshparkar's weapon in one of Li Shunxian's poems is the evidence of her religious belief. He further argued that the emperor Wang Zongyan became a Zoroastrian under the influence of the Li siblings. Lo inferred that Li Xun was Christian on the grounds that East Syriac Christianity was particularly reliant on medicine for its transmission in Tang empire. Chen Ming stated in his 2007 article that he was "inclined to agree with Lo Hsiang-lin, and to conclude that Li Xun was probably a Nestorian who was influenced by Taoism". Lo's idea was also supported by Zhang Xushan as the latter called Li Xun an East Syriac Christian proficient in medical skills. However, both suppositions lack solid evidence and remain to be proven.

== See also ==
Christianity in Sichuan

- Christianity in Sichuan
  - Catholic Church in Sichuan
  - Protestantism in Sichuan
    - Anglicanism in Sichuan
    - Methodism in Sichuan
    - Quakerism in Sichuan
    - Baptist Christianity in Sichuan
    - Seventh-day Adventist Church in Sichuan

Related topics

- Assyrian Church of the East
- Church of the East in China
- Church of the East in India
- Dioceses of the Church of the East to 1318
- Expansion of East Syriac Christianity in medieval Asia
- Khara-Khoto East Syriac Christian manuscripts
- Mogao East Syriac Christian painting
- Murals from the Christian temple at Qocho
