= Eustace Haydon =

Canadian religious historian and humanist activist

- Born: Albert Eustace Haydon; January 17, 1880; Brampton, Ontario, Canada
- Died: April 1, 1975 (aged 95); Santa Monica, California, US

Academic background
- Education: McMaster University; University of Saskatchewan; University of Chicago
- Thesis: The Conception of God in the Pragmatic Philosophy (1918)

Academic work
- Discipline: History; religious studies
- Sub-discipline: Comparative religion; history of religion
- Institutions: University of Chicago
- Influenced: David Crockett Graham

Albert Eustace Haydon (January 17, 1880 – 1 April 1975) was a Canadian historian of religion and a leader of the humanist movement.

== Biography ==
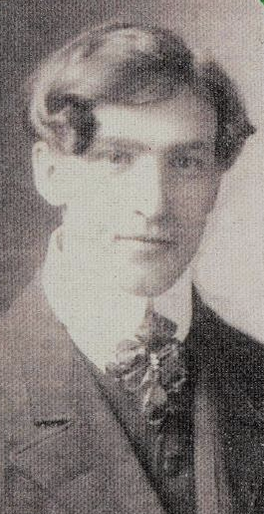
Haydon, c. 1900–1909

Haydon was ordained to Baptist ministry and served a church in Dresden, Ontario, in 1903–04. He ministered to the First Unitarian Society of Madison, Wisconsin, from 1918 to 1923. He was head of the Department of Comparative Religion at the University of Chicago from 1919 to 1945. While there, he was an influential voice of naturalist humanism. In 1933 he was one of signers of the Humanist Manifesto. The American Humanist Association awarded him the Humanist of the Year award in 1956.

Haydon's Biography of the Gods is an account of the origin of human belief in Gods and the rise and decline of Gods throughout history. Chapters are dedicated to the belief in Ahura Mazda, the Gods of China, India, Japan and the God in Abrahamic religions. Haydon concludes that just as belief in most of the old Gods is dead, the Christian God is no exception and is on the road to extinction. According to Haydon, Gods are invented so long as they meet real human needs (emotional and economic) and fulfill desires, fantasies and longings. When man's beliefs and fancies change the Gods die and substitutions take their place. Personal Gods outnumber abstract deities because the latter do not serve man's emotional nature or demands of practical living.

== Selected publications ==
- The Quest of the Ages (1929)
- Man's Search for the Good Life (1937)
- Biography of the Gods (1941, 1967)
- Modern Trends in World Religions (1968)
