= David Crockett Graham =

American polymath (1884–1961)

- Graham in Seattle, WA, USA in 1940 just before returning to China
- Born: March 21, 1884; Green Forest, Arkansas
- Died: September 15, 1961 (aged 77); Englewood, Colorado
- Education: B.A., Whitman College (1908); B.D., Rochester Theological Seminary (1911); M.A., University of Chicago (1920); Ph.D., University of Chicago (1928); Honorary D.Sci., Whitman College (1931)
- Occupations: Missionary, Zoological Collector, Archaeologist, Anthropologist
- Employer: West China Union University
- Spouse: Alicia May Morey (1883-1955) Honors Fellow of the Royal Geographical Society 1929 Guggenheim Scholar 1952, 1955

David Crockett Graham (Chinese name: 葛維漢, pinyin: Ge Weihan; Wade–Giles: Kê Wei-han; 21 March 1884 – 15 September 1961) was a polymath American Baptist minister and missionary, educator, author, archaeologist, anthropologist, naturalist and field collector in the Province of Sichuan (formerly spelled Szechwan) during the Chinese Republican Era, from 1911 to 1948. He was a 32nd degree Mason, and a past master of the Szechwan Lodge No. 112. From 1921 to 1942, Graham collected and sent to the Smithsonian Institution nearly 400,000 zoological specimens, including more than 230 new species and 9 new genera, of which 29 were named after him (see below). From 1932 to 1942 he was curator of the Museum of Art, Archaeology and Ethnology at the West China Union University, which still stands as part of Sichuan University, in Chengdu. There, he taught comparative religions at the theological college, and archaeology and anthropology at the university. He wrote extensively and spent his retirement years, from 1950 to 1961, in Englewood, Colorado compiling his writings and research into three books that were published by the Smithsonian Institution. A fourth manuscript lay in the Whitman College and Northwest Archives until it was discovered by Hartmut Walravens, who edited it and published it in 2018. McKhann refers to Graham as "One of a handful of Western missionaries whose scientific work was respected by other scientists—and of even fewer scientists whose religious work was respected by other missionaries."

== Early life and education ==
Graham was born in Green Forest, Arkansas on March 21, 1884 to William Edward Graham (20 February 1841 – 28 March 1904) and Elizabeth Belinda (Atchley) Graham (14 August 1844 – 28 August 1888). His family moved to Walla Walla, Washington when he was a small child, and he grew up there. When he was 4 years old, his mother died of TB, and his older sister Elmina Elizabeth Graham (13 August 1876 – 4 July 1962), who had just turned 12, raised him. Elmina was a strong believer in education and supported David through his education (she herself received a B.A. from Whitman College, 1908, an M.A. from University of Washington, 1921, and became an Associate Professor and Dean of Kansas State Teachers College). Graham entered Whitman College in 1904 and graduated with a Bachelor of Arts in 1908. He then entered Rochester Theological Seminary where he studied under and was influenced by Walter Rauschenbusch. He completed his studies for the Bachelor of Divinity in 1911.

Graham was ordained at the First Baptist Church in Fairport, New York, joined the American Baptist Foreign Mission Society, and sailed for China in September 1911 with his wife Alicia Morey Graham (whom he had married in 1910). He spent the next 37 years in China with periodic returns to the U.S. on furlough to further his education. On his return from 1918 to 1919, he entered the School of Divinity at the University of Chicago and completed a Master of Arts. His thesis reflected his growing interest in the Chinese and their religions and was influenced by Eustace Haydon who was head of the Department of Comparative Religions. It was also during this trip that he began correspondence with, and then visited, the United States National Museum. There he received training and made arrangements to collect natural history specimens for them. Graham returned to the U.S. again from 1926 to 1927 to complete a Ph.D. at the University of Chicago. This time his dissertation reflected his ongoing research and studies in China and was subsequently published by the Smithsonian Institution. Graham returned to the U.S. again at the end of 1930. He spent 1931 studying archaeology with Fay-Cooper Cole at the University of Chicago and in the same year received an honorary Doctor of Science from Whitman College. He then went on to Harvard University, where he studied anthropology and archaeology theory under Alfred Tozzer and Earnest Hooton as well as linguistics under R.B. Dixon.

On his return to China in September, 1932, Graham moved from Xuzhou (Suifu) to Chengdu (Chengtu) and joined the faculty of the West China Union University. There he taught anthropology and archaeology and served as curator of the Museum of Archaeology, Art, and Ethnology where he taught until his retirement in 1948. He also taught comparative religions at the Theological Seminary.

== China, 1911–1948 ==
The years that Graham was in China, 1911-1948, were marked by instability and turbulence. They began with the overthrow of the Qing Dynasty in 1911 (see Xinhai Revolution) while Graham was in transit from the United States and ended with the formation of the People's Republic of China in 1949 following the Chinese Communist Revolution, which concluded less than a year after Graham retired and returned to the United States.

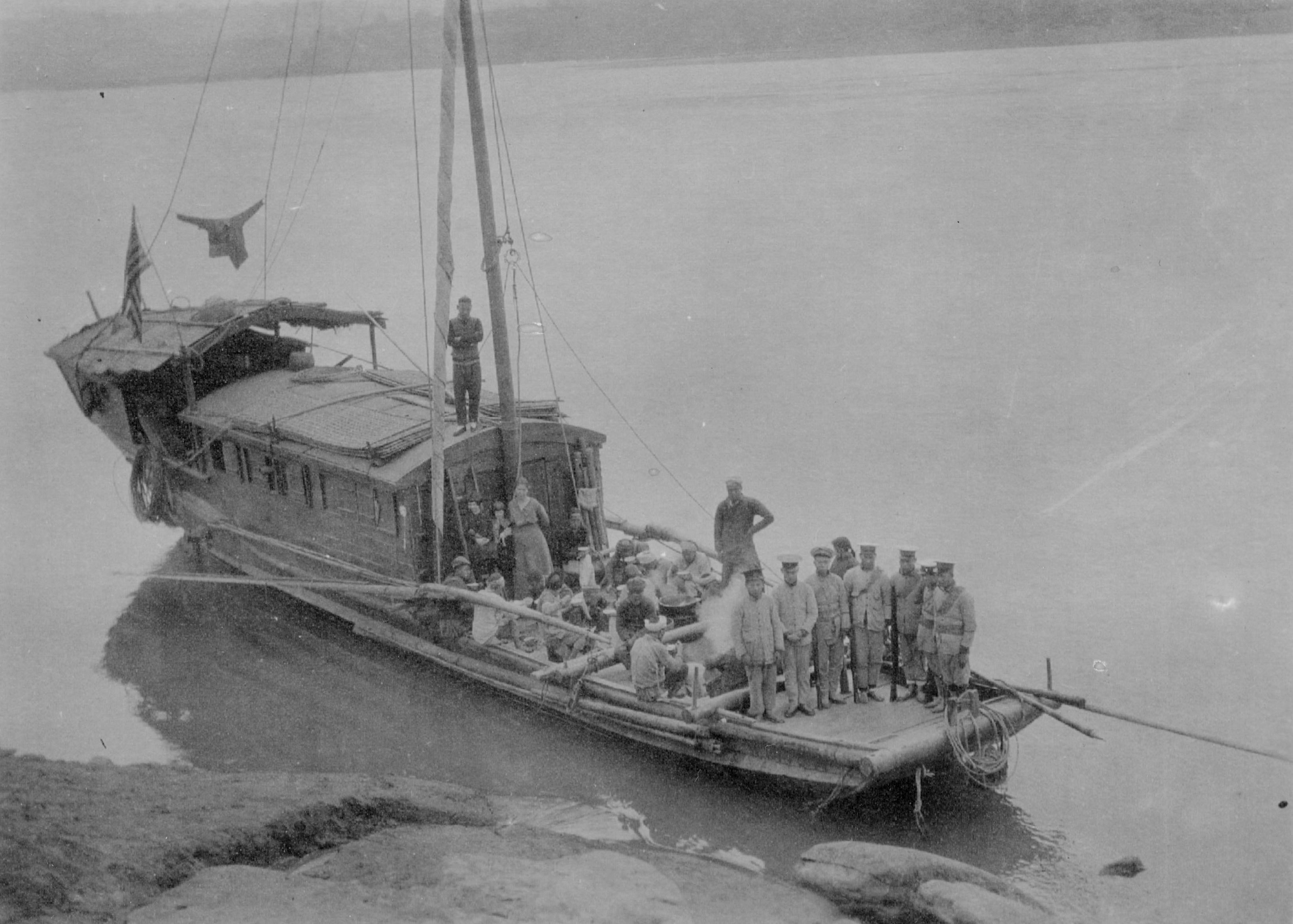
The Graham's houseboat on the Yangtze in 1920.

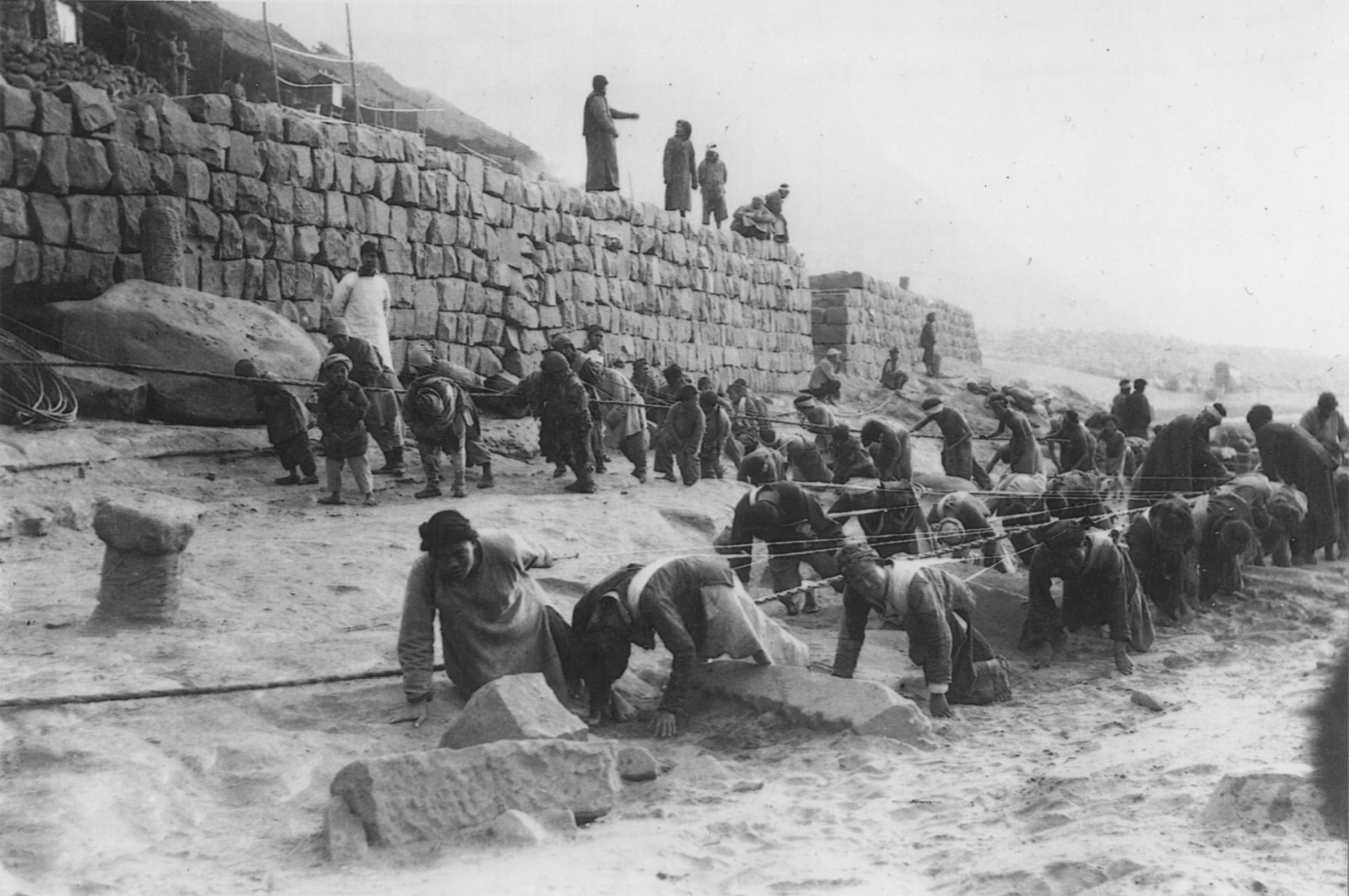
Trackers pulling a houseboat through rapids on the Yangtze in 1913.

Sichuan (Szechuan) in West China was remote from the central government (normally in Nanjing), and required a two-month trip up the Yangtze River to reach Xuzhou. The Western Provinces were ruled by warlords and were rife with bandits in the countryside. There were revolts in the West when Yuan Shikai declared himself emperor in 1915, and Yunnan Province invaded Sichuan. Xuzhou (where Graham was stationed) is on the Yangtze river near the border of Yunnan and was occupied by Yunnan troops.

Throughout most of this period of time, there were conflicts with the Japanese. The Japanese declared war on Germany early in World War I and had a large contingent in Versailles to participate in treaty negotiations. The resulting Treaty of Versailles in 1919 awarded Germany's holdings in the Pacific, North of the equator, including Shandong, China, to Japan. This led to outrage among the Chinese and to the May Fourth Movement protesting imperialism and instigating violence against westerners. The 1920s was an ongoing period of instability and warlordism. Both Sun Yat-sen and Yuan Shikai died. Chiang Kai-shek consolidated power through the Northern Expedition against warlords in 1926 to 1928, but never really controlled all of China. The Nanking Incident in 1927 again demonstrated Chinese hostility toward imperialist powers. Civil war between the Nationalists and Communists began in 1927, and the Japanese invaded Manchuria in 1931. Both of these hostilities continued, and Japan declared all out war on China in 1937. The Chinese Nationalist government was relocated to Chongqing (Chungking) in Sichuan, and many students and faculty evacuated from Eastern Universities were relocated to Chengdu, where Graham was from 1932 to 1948. Chengdu itself was bombed by the Japanese as early as 1938. Meanwhile, the Soviet Union was engaged in military action in Xinjiang. Around 1942, Japan had taken over Indo-China and Burma, completely cutting off western China, except for flights over the Himalayas.

As World War II was coming to a close, the Soviet Union invaded Manchuria. In the aftermath of the War, Chiang Kai-shek was severely weakened, the Chinese economy was ruined, inflation was rampant, and the Communist Revolution was gaining strength. The era of the Republic of China ended on the mainland, and the era of the People's Republic of China began in 1949.

During the years that Graham was in China, there were numerous incidents in which foreigners, and sometimes missionaries or Christians in particular, were the targets of violence. The May Fourth Movement and the Nanking Incident were prominent examples (the Boxer Rebellion antedated his time in China). The Communist's animosity toward Christianity also resulted in killings (see for example, Murders of John and Betty Stam). Graham himself was held captive by Communist troops in 1933, but managed to talk his way out. There was also widespread violence in the countryside by bandits and brigands. Graham typically had to hire military guards on his field trips and nevertheless had many narrow escapes.

== Ministry and mission ==
Graham came from humble and difficult beginnings, but also from a long line of devout Christians with many Baptist ministers among his forebears. He was active in the Baptist Church as a young person and, while he was an undergraduate at Whitman College, decided to become a missionary. He then attended Rochester Theological Seminary where he was influenced by Walter Rauschenbusch. His mission in life was that of a Christian humanist. He was determined not just to spread the word of God, but to help others wherever possible. While missionary work was the reason Graham went to China, it is the least well documented of the many facets of his contributions. There are some letters published in the Fairport County Mail, and there are some references from authors who had access to his unpublished memoirs.

1911–1918 Graham spent a year in the western districts of Shaoshing learning the language and customs of China. He was then assigned to Xuzhou, a two-month journey up the Yangtze River, where he was stationed until 1918. During this time, because of his heroic actions in the field of fire, treating wounded soldiers and negotiating for peace, he was awarded both the Red Cross Medal by the Chinese Red Cross and a Decoration of the First Order for Bravery by the Governor of Yunnan Province.

Second term in Xuzhou 1919–1926

Third term in Xuzhou alone 1927–1931

First term in Chengdu 1932–1939, he became the acting secretary of Szechwan Lodge No. 112, and spent a week in Shanghai lecturing at the Royal Asiatic Society on "The Customs, Art and Religion of the Chuan Miao".

Second term in Chengdu 1940–1948

In his retirement years (1950–1961) in Englewood, Colorado, Graham was a member of the First Baptist Church of Denver and was a leader in the Social Action Committee. Among other things, he was one of the first to encourage exchanges between the black and white Churches of Denver.

Later on, Graham worked with William Reginald Morse to pool donations together for the medical anthropology at the Peabody.

== Chinese Name ==
Graham was given the Chinese name 葛維漢 (simplified Chinese: 葛维汉, Wade-Giles: Kê Wei-han, pinyin: Ge Weihan), which is a transliteration of Graham. However, there are a number of different ways Graham could have been transliterated. The specific choice of a Chinese name is influenced by the additional meanings of the symbols. In this case, 維 with 漢 has the meaning: Protector of the Han, or Protector of the Chinese People. While there doesn't appear to be any record of the origin of this choice, it seems to fit with his first term in Xuzhou and his humanitarian efforts during the civil war between Yunnan and Sichuan, for which he received the Red Cross Medal from the Chinese Red Cross and later (in 1920) received a decoration of the first order from the governor of Yunnan for bravery.

== Natural history collections ==
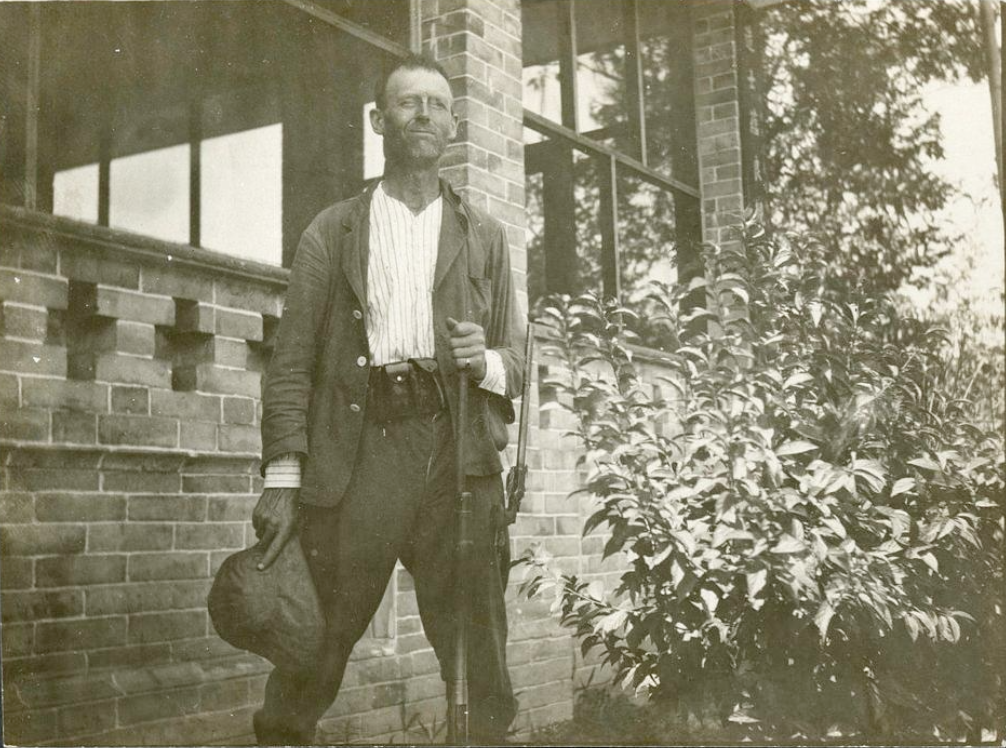
David Crockett Graham at Yazhou (Yachow) at the end of a collecting trip to Kangding (Tatsienlu) in 1923.

Graham first made formal arrangements with the National Museum of Natural History (NMNH) at the Smithsonian on his furlough to the U.S. during 1918 and 1919. While in China, from then until 1938, he spent his vacations and summers traveling and collecting zoological specimens for the Smithsonian. Graham's diaries of these trips have been included in the Smithsonian Transcription Project and can be viewed online. They are also available in print, edited and published by Hartmut Walravens.

== Anthropology, ethnology, and archaeology ==
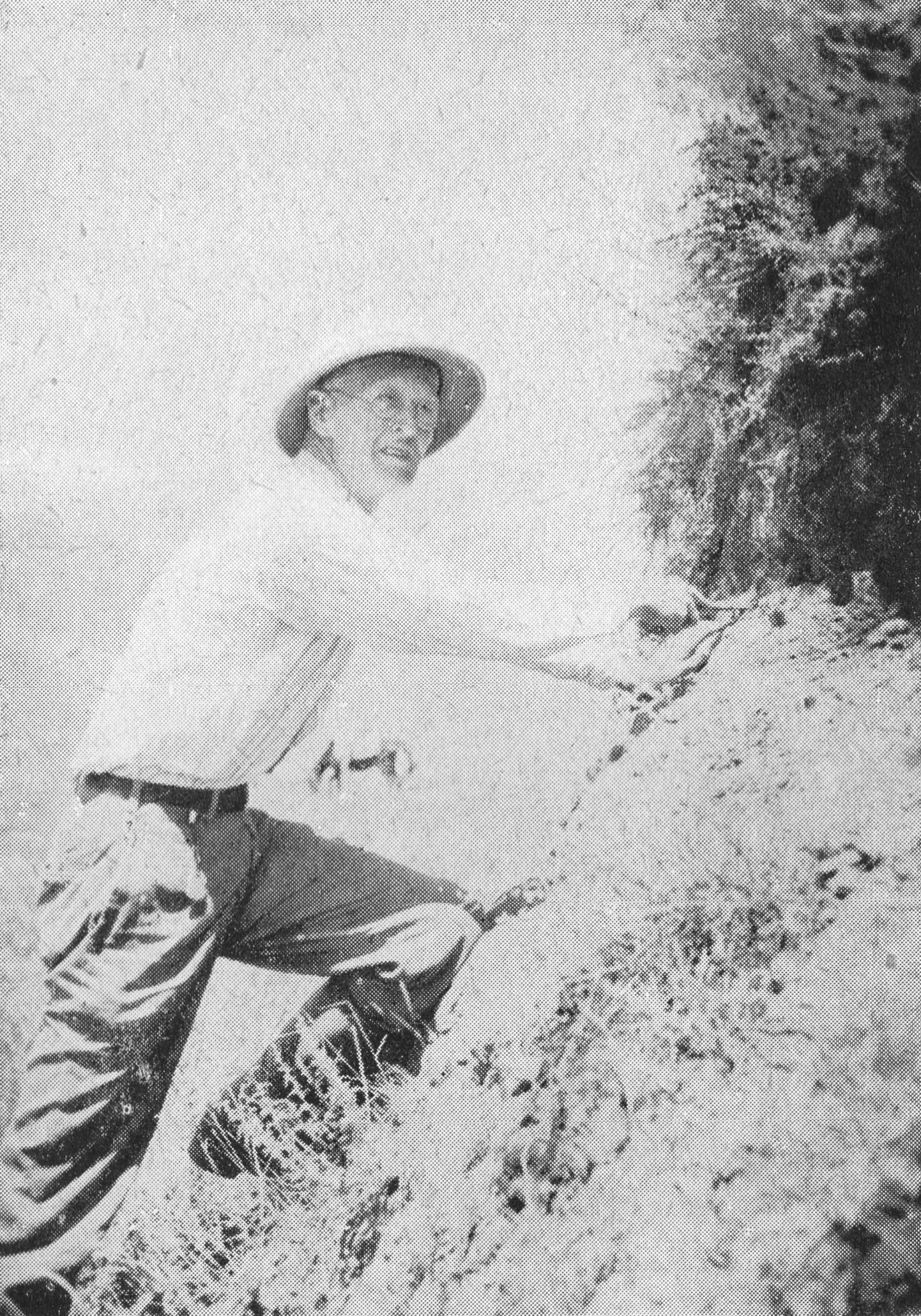
D.C. Graham investigating a prehistoric site near Daofu (Tao Fu), in the Xikang (Si-Kang) region.

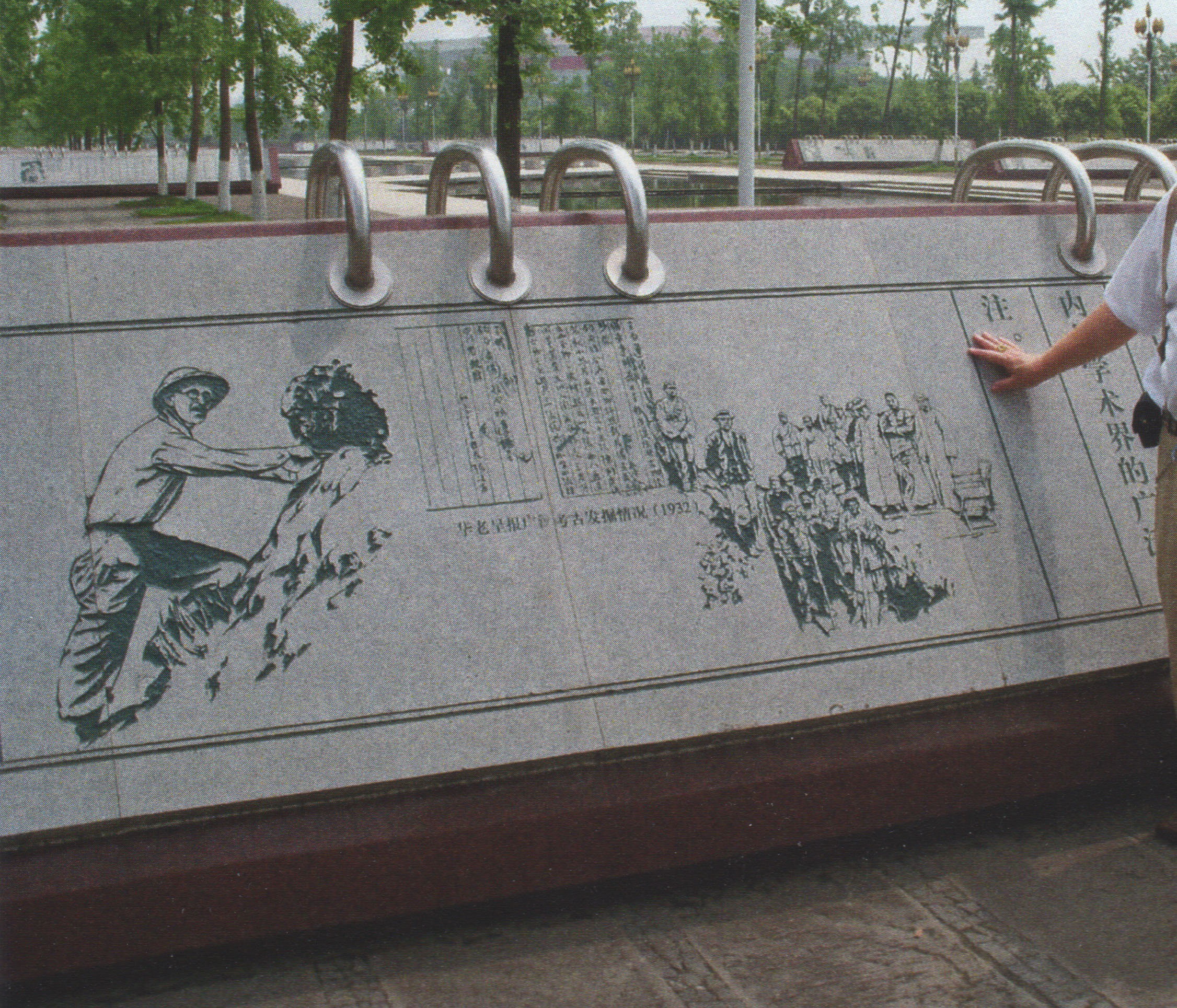
D.C. Graham's image on the History Wall at Sichuan University, Chengdu, China.

By 1930, Graham's interest in archaeology had been growing for years, as indicated by a 1926 article in support of the West China Union University (WCUU) Museum and publications on the ancient caves of Sichuan. In early 1931, Graham left Xuzhou to return to the U.S. on furlough, in preparation for taking the position of Director of the WCUU Museum in Chengdu. He spent 1931 and 1932 in postgraduate studies in Anthropology and Archaeology (see Early life and education).

On his return to Sichuan in early 1933, Graham moved to Chengdu and began organizing and cataloging the stored holdings of the museum. His attention was drawn to a collection of Jade pieces contributed to the museum by a British missionary, V.H. Donnithorne, in 1931. These were from Guanghan county where a farmer, Yan Daocheng, had discovered them while digging an irrigation ditch in 1927. Graham decided to investigate and headed up a team with the museum's assistant curator, Lin Min-Juin, to undertake an archaeological excavation. This was the first archaeological excavation of what is now known as Sanxingdui. Graham's preliminary report has since been republished in China both in Chinese and in English. Graham dated the site to 1100 BC and earlier, believed there was a clear link to the cultures of central and northern China, and concluded that there was likely much more to be found in this area. All of this was confirmed by archaeological work decades later. Unfortunately, Graham was unable to do any further excavation himself because of a national Administrative Yuan order in 1934 enforcing the Antiquities Preservation Law, restricting archaeological excavations in China and requiring collaboration with and financing of researchers from Academia Sinica. After that, Graham had to rely more on purchasing artifacts for the museum from antiquarian dealers, without the benefits of proper excavation.

== Species named after D.C. Graham ==
D.C. Graham began collecting zoological specimens for the United States National Museum (the Smithsonian Institution) after 1919 and continued collecting in Sichuan and Tibet on his vacations and summers until he left China in 1948. Around the time of his death in 1961, several sources stated that Graham had collected nearly 400,000 specimens from which were identified over 230 new species and 9 new genera. Of those, 29 were named after him. While the number of specimens he collected remains fixed, the other numbers have changed over time. The specimens Graham collected are still being studied, and new species have been named at least as recently as 2009. The Smithsonian's digitized collection catalog, while by no means complete, is the best overall source. Specimens Graham collected are tagged "D.C. Graham." Entering that (in quotes) for the Smithsonian's search term currently (as of 14 December 2011) turns up 540 taxonomic type specimens of which 348 are holotypes. Careful searches turn up 60 species and a genus (Grahamomyia bicellula Alexander, 1935) named after Graham. But even this is not up to date. Ahrens, in a review of the genus Serica, found 4 new species among Graham's specimens and named one of them after Graham (Serica (Serica) grahami). In a subsequent analysis, Ahrens named 4 more species of Serica based on Graham's specimens. These latter 4 have yet to show up in the Smithsonian collection catalog (access-date 14 December 2011).

D.C. Graham collected primarily in Sichuan around Xuzhou and Chengdu, and on trips to the Sichuan highlands, the West China borderlands, and into Tibet. There was a Rev. John Graham who collected at least from 1900 to 1920 primarily from Yunnan Province, with specimens cited as being from Yunnanfu and Wuding District (Wutingchow). There are a number of species (particularly fish, some snakes and Rana grahami) that were named after John Graham. To say that a species is named after D.C. Graham, the type specimen should have been collected by him, from the areas he collected, during the dates he collected, and be in the Smithsonian. Otherwise, there should be an explicit statement in the publication in which it was named. There are also instances in which specimens are reclassified, resulting in changes in names.

The following are ordered alphabetically by taxonomic classification. For example, Animalia Arthropoda comes before Animalia Chordata. Links to Wikispecies and to the Smithsonian should show full classification and references as well as historical synonyms resulting from reclassifications.

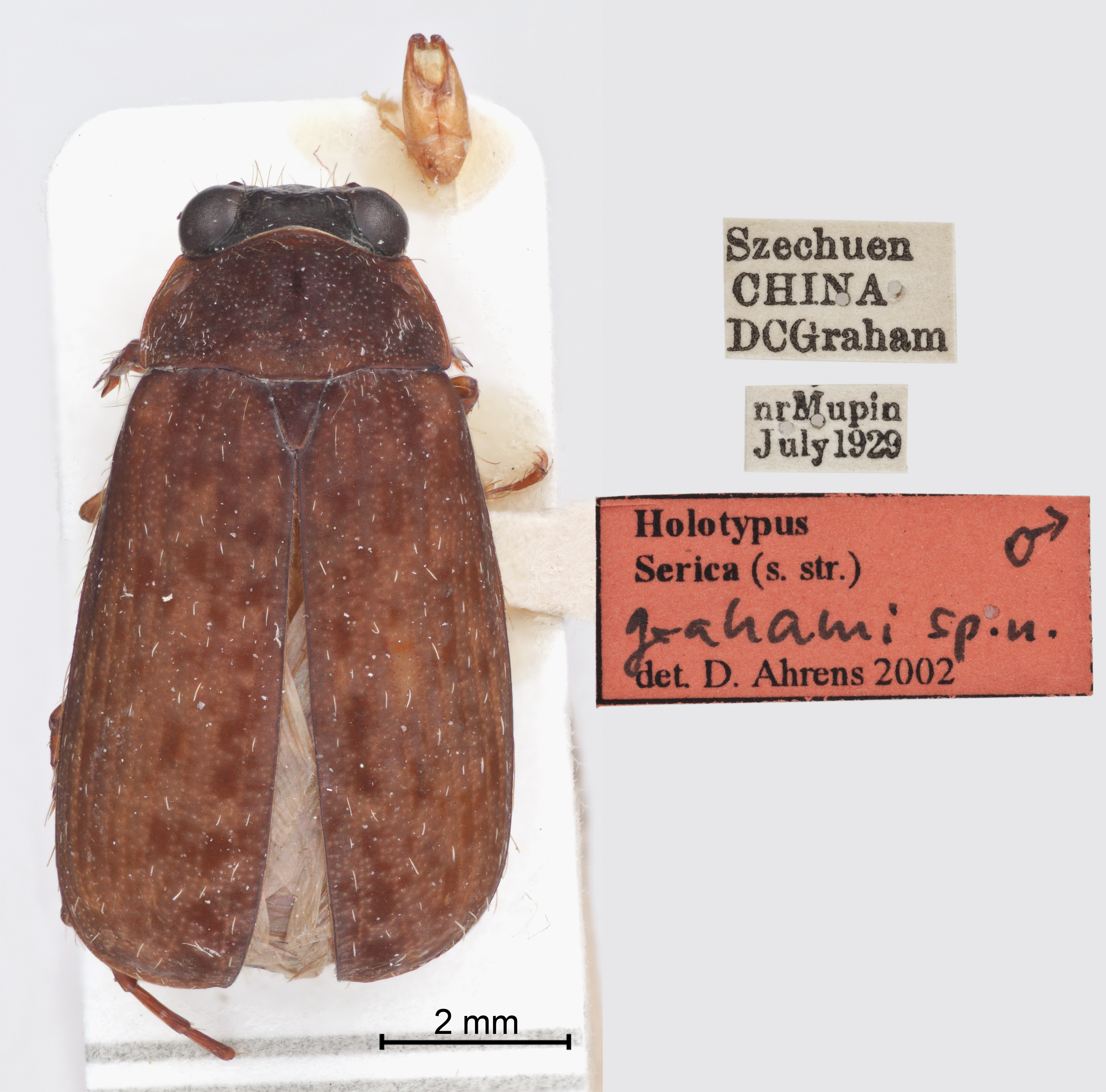
Holotype specimen for Serica grahami Ahrens, 2005.

Heteropoda grahami Fox — USNM #1153
Lycosa grahami Fox — USNM #1141
Myrmarachne grahami Fox — USNM #1163
Sigipinius grahami Hoffman — USNM #2678
Spirobolus grahami Keeton — USNM #2540
Stenothemus grahami Wittmer — USNM #73893
Carabus (Pagocarabus) grahamianus Mandl, 1975 — USNM #104316
Cryptocephalus grahami Gressitt & Kimoto — USNM #80000006
Lilioceris grahami Gressitt & Kimoto — USNM #69985
Platycorynus grahami Gressitt & Kimoto — USNM #69988
Opilo grahami Chapin — USNM #40245
Byturodes grahami Barber, 1941 — USNM #55459
Serica grahami Ahrens, 2005 — USNM
Calliphora grahami Aldrich, 1930 — USNM #26865
Conops grahami Camras, 1960 — USNM #64477
Scaptomyza grahami Hackman, 1959 — USNM
Lipoptena grahami Bequaert — USNM
Homoneura grahami Malloch — USNM #40346
Ormosia grahami Alexander, 1931 — USNM #10403764
Eriocera grahami Alexander, 1927 — USNM #40318
Grahamomyia bicellula Alexander, 1935 — USNM
Limonia (Dicranomyia) grahamiana Alexander, 1933 — USNM #10404420
Fannia grahami Chillcott, 1961 — USNM #64541
Euprosopia grahami Malloch — USNM #43070
Rhagio grahami Malloch — USNM #50571
Tenthredomyia grahami Shannon — USNM #27820
Chrysomikia grahami Villeneuve — USNM
Simoma grahami Aldrich — USNM #28930
Tipula (Vestiplex) grahami Alexander, 1933 — USNM
Philagra grahami Metcalf & Horton, 1934 — USNM #70201876
Bremus grahami Frison, 1933 — USNM #50123
Leptocimbex grahami Malaise — USNM #56325
Sphecodes grahami Cockerell, 1922 — USNM #24886
Hemipepsis grahami Wahis — USNM #66812
Psen affinis grahami Van Lith — USNM #69074
Siobla grahami Malaise — USNM
Tenthredo grahami Malaise — USNM
Vespula grahami Yarrow — USNM #67063
Notodonta grahami Schaus, 1928 — USNM #33420
Panorpa grahami Carpenter, 1938 — USNM #52860
Chrysopa grahami Banks, 1940 — USNM #5128
Hemerobius grahami Banks, 1940 — USNM #5148
Agrion grahami Needham, 1930 — USNM
Xiphidiopsis grahami Tinkham, 1942 — USNM #3586
Acroneuria grahamia Wu & Claassen, 1934 — USNM #55239
Togoperla grahami Banks, 1940 — USNM #53139
Agapetus grahami Ross, 1956 — USNM #71038
Hydropsyche grahami Banks, 1940 — USNM #53165
Pseudostenophylax fumosus grahami Martynov, 1931 — USNM #43160
Rhyacophila grahami Banks, 1940 — USNM #53154
Stenopsyche grahami Martynov, 1931 — USNM #43153
Potamon (Potamon) grahami Rathbun, 1931 — USNM #58755
Microhyla grahami (Stejneger, 1924) — USNM #65936
Antiornis grahami (Riley) — USNM #303857
Dryonastes grahami (Riley, 1922) — USNM #257204
Lepus grahami (Howell, 1928) — USNM #239875
Diploderma grahami (Stejneger, 1924) — USNM #65500
Melania (Plotiopsis) grahami Chen, 1937 — USNM #467600
Viviparus quadratus grahami Chen, 1945 — USNM #334007

== Selected publications ==
Walravens listed 178 publications by David Crockett Graham. Following are just a select few. Two of the journals in which some of these were published are the Chinese Recorder (CR) and the Journal of the West China Border Research Society (JWCBRS).

- Graham, David Crockett (1919). Indications of primitive Chinese religion in the Confucian classics. Thesis (M.A.). University of Chicago. OCLC 47084179.
- Graham, David Crockett (1927). Religion in Szechuan province. Thesis (Ph.D.). University of Chicago.
- Graham, David Crockett (1928). Religion in Szechuan province, China (with twenty-five plates). Smithsonian Miscellaneous Collections. Vol. v. 80, no. 10. Smithsonian Institution. OCLC 4392252.
- "The ancient caves of Szechuan province." CR 61:432-440 (1930).
- "Religion in Szechuan Province." West China Missionary News, 1930 June, 20-23.
- "The Lolo of Szechuan province, China." American Anthropologist, 32:703-705 (1930).
- "Seven Lolo sacred books." Translated by D.C. Graham, CR 62:575-586 (1931). incl. 3 ill. of amulets.
- "Bridge for becoming immortals." Translated by D.C. Graham, CR 63:171-177,226-237,301-307,372-382 (1932).
- "Persistence of custom as illustrated in the collections of Han dynasty clay images in the West China Union University Museum." JWCBRS 6/34:105-106 (1933). 9 pl.
- "A preliminary report of the Hanchow excavations." JWCBRS 6/34:114-131 (1933). 18 pl.
- "A late neolithic culture in Szechwan province." JWCBRS 7:90-97 (1935). 1 pl.
- "Historic notes on the P'o Jên (Beh Ren). The last group of the pre-Chinese Thai people to remain in Szechwan." JWCBRS 8:82-87 (1936). 3 pl.
- "The hawk-cuckoo (hierococcyx sparveroides) in Chinese tradition and belief." [By] Lin Min Chuin (Translated by D.C. Graham) JWCBRS 8:145-152 (1936).
- "Archaeology in West China." China Journal 26.1937:4, S.172-174, 8pp., ill.
- "Excavation of a Han dynasty tomb at Chungking." JWCBRS 10:185-190 (1938) 25 ill.
- "Temmoku porcelain in Szechwan province, China." Man 38:177-179 (1938).
- "Anthropological research in West China." Man 39:130 (1939). [Graham was listed as local correspondent of the Royal Anthropological Society.]
- "Biggest migration in the world in Chinese trek to the West. 40,000,000 people, including more than 30 universities and their students, in mass escape from invasion." Science news letter. 1939: Dez., 373.
- "The greatest trek in human history." Missions 31.1940:4, p. 206-210.
- "The religion of the Ch'uan Miao." The review of religion. March 1941,276-289.
- "The Chengtu School for the Blind, Deaf, and Dumb." West China Missionary News 7/12:149-150 (1942).
- "New species and genera from the collection of David Crockett Graham in the Smithsonian Institution." JWCBRS 15B:189-200 (1945).
- "Jidujiao yu xiaoji wenti" 基督教与孝祭问题 [Christianity, Filal [sic] Piety and Ancestor Worship]. Translated by Chen Zongwen, 陈宗文译. The Christian Omnibook 基督教叢刊, 10:79-80 (1945). Chengtu: The United Christian Publishers.
- "Qiangmin de zongjiao" 羌民的宗教 [The Religion of the Ch'iang]. Translated by Zhong Ji, 钟季译. The Christian Weekly 天风, 32:11 (1946). Chengtu: The United Christian Publishers.
- "Qiangmin de fengsu he zongjiao" 羌民的风俗和宗教 [The Customs and Religion of the Ch'iang]. Translated by Xu Songshi 徐松石译. The Christian Weekly 天风周刊, 78:10-11 (1947). Shanghai: The United Christian Publishers.
- "Songs and stories of the Ch'uan Miao." Washington: Smithsonian Institution 1954, XI,336 pp. (Smithsonian Institution. Publications. 4139.)
- "A Lolo story: The greed god O-li-bi-zih by Lin Kuang-tien." Translated by D.C. Graham. Journal of American Folklore. 68:175-199 (1955).
- "The customs and religion of the Ch'iang (with 16 plates)." Washington, D.C.: Smithsonian Institution 1958. VII,114 pp., 16 pl. (Smithsonian Institution. Publication. 4300.)
- "Folk Religion in Southwest China. (With 28 plates.)" Washington, D.C.: Smithsonian Institution 1961. Viii,246 pp. (2nd pr. 1967.) (Smithsonian Institution Publication. 4457.)
- "More Songs and Stories of the Ch'uan Miao." Edited by Hartmut Walravens. Weisbaden: Harrassowitz Verlag 2018. 329 pp. (Abhandlungen für die Kunde des Morgenlandes, Bd. 112.)
- 葛维汉在华西 ["David Crockett Graham in West China" - Autobiography]. Translated by Bian Simei 卞思梅 and Peng Wenbin 彭文斌. Chengdu: Tiandi Publishing House 天地出版社. 2022. 228pp.

== Publications about ==
There have been a few notable publications about Graham in recent years. McKhann and Waxman; Kyong-McClain and Jing; and Walravens; have all been cited elsewhere in this article and appear below in the References section. Additional publications include:

- Brown, Susan (1986). David Crockett Graham: Anthropologist, Collector, and Missionary in China. Thesis (B.A.). Whitman College.
- Graham, David Crockett; Shaomin Li; Zhou Shurong (2004). 葛维汉民族学考古学论著; Ge Weihan min zu xue kao gu xue lun zhu. Chengdu Shi: Ba Shu shu she. ISBN 978-7-806-59562-6. OCLC 57250133.
- Harrell, Steven (2011). "Introduction: Explorers, Scientists, and Imperial Knowledge Production in Early Twentieth-Century China". In Denise M. Glover; Stevan Harrell; Charles F. McKhann; Margaret Byrne Swain (eds.). Explorers and scientists in China's borderlands, 1880-1950. Seattle: University of Washington Press. pp. 3–25. ISBN 978-0-295-99118-4.
- Cummings, Alex Sayf (Fall 2009). "Life in the Menagerie: David Crockett Graham and Missionary-Scientists in Sichuan, China 1911-1948". American Baptist Quarterly. 27 (3): 206–227. ISSN 0745-3698.

== See also ==
- Baptist Christianity in Sichuan
- The West China Missionary News
