= History of Baptist Christianity in Sichuan =

History and implantation of Baptist Christianity in Sichuan

The history of Baptist Christianity in Sichuan (or "West China") (Note: Sichuan, formerly romanized as Szchuan, Szechuan, or Szechwan; also referred to as "West China".) began in 1890 when missionaries began arriving from the United States. Baptist missionaries in Sichuan were organized under the American Baptist Missionary Union, later renamed American Baptist Foreign Mission Society. Missionary activity in China generated controversy among many native Chinese and faced armed opposition during both the Boxer Rebellion and the later Communist movement in China. Although the former did not affect Sichuan so much as some other parts of China, the province was one of the hotbeds of anti-missionary riots throughout its ecclesiastical history.

Numerous mission properties and native church leaders in Sichuan were respectively destroyed and killed by communists in the mid-1930s. Missionary activity ceased after the communist take over of China in 1949. Under government oppression in the 1950s, Baptist congregations and other Protestant churches across China severed their ties with overseas churches, and their congregations subsequently merged into the Three-Self Patriotic Church. Since 1980, their services have been provided by the China Christian Council.

== History ==
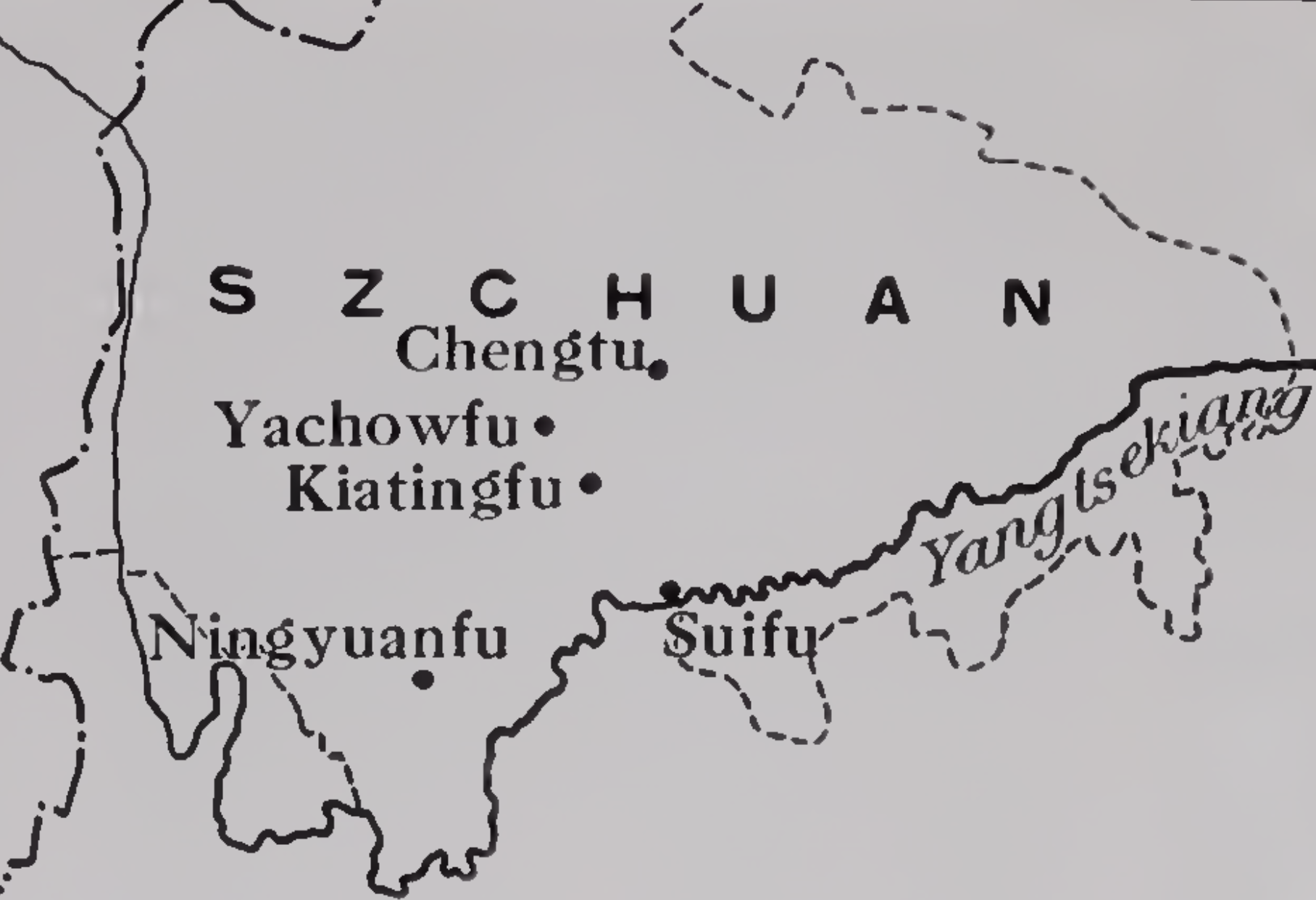
Map of Sichuan showing American Baptist Mission stations: Chengdu (Chengtu), Yazhou (Yachow), Jiading (Kiatingfu), Ningyuan (Ningyuanfu), and Xuzhou (Suifu).

Baptist Christianity was introduced into Sichuan by the American Baptist Missionary Union (ABMU, belonging to the American Baptist Churches USA). The first missionaries to reach the province were Rev. William M. Upcraft and Rev. George Warner, who sailed in 1889. The journey required many weeks before their arrival in Xuzhou the following year, where they established the mission's first station. Medical work was started by Rev. C. H. Finch in 1891, in the same year Rev. Robert Wellwood and his wife joined the mission.

At the end of 1892, the ABMU was represented by nine missionaries, with medical work, two preaching places, women's classes, a boys' school, a Sunday school and eleven converts. In 1893, twelve new workers joined the mission, and subsequently the opening of a new station in Jiading in 1894. At that time, the number of missionaries connected with the West China Mission was twenty-two. A small church had been gathered at Xuzhou. The remote character of the province and its need of Christian missionary labors lent a romantic and unusual interest to the work of the West China Mission, especially since that was the nearest approach of American Baptists to reaching the people of an unevangelized country, Tibet.

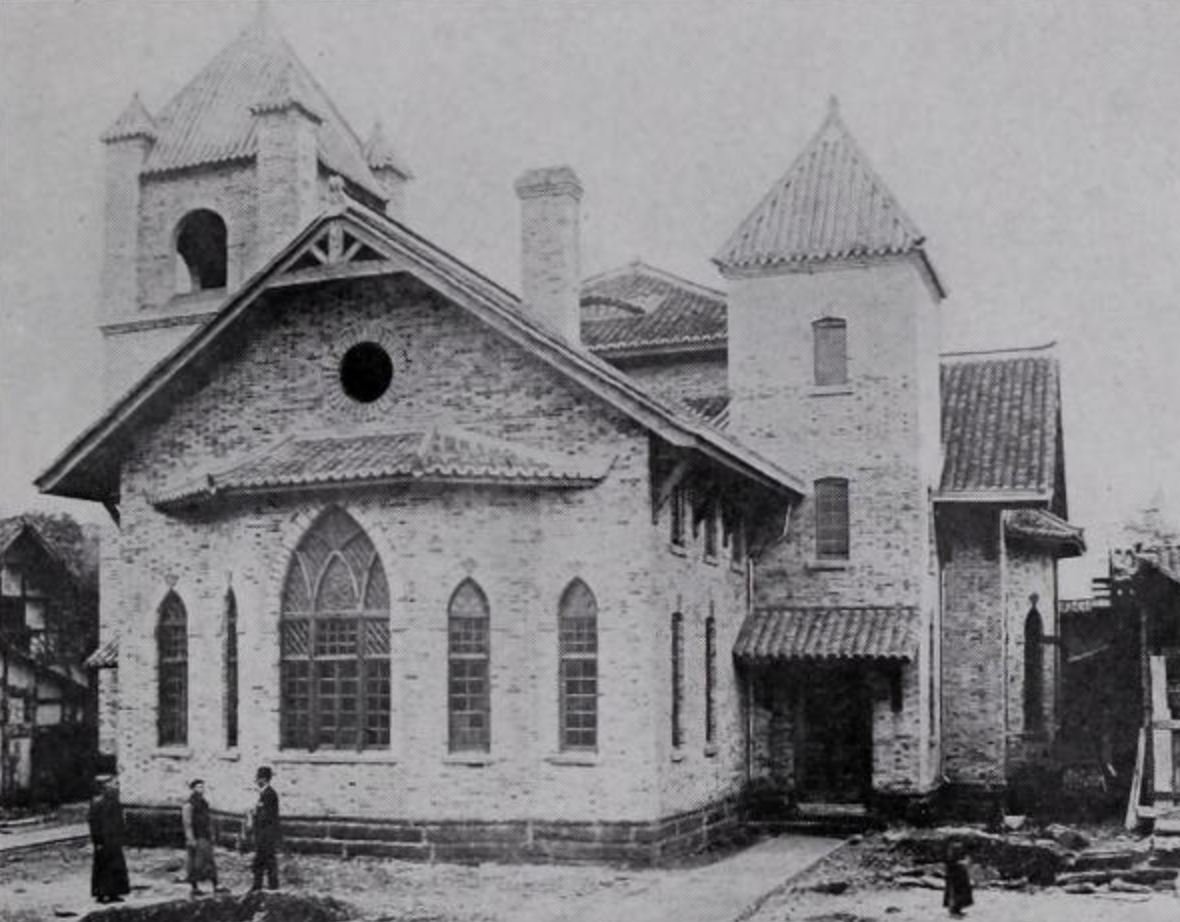
American Baptist church at Yazhou, 1920.

That same year (1894), Upcraft and H. J. Openshaw traveled to Yazhou and tried to rent some permanent quarters. According to Missionary Cameralogs: West China, "this stirred up opposition and vile placards were posted abusing the foreigners. However, the tide was turned in favor of the missionaries after successfully treating the servant of an official bitten by a snake, they were allowed to stay."

In 1895, a serious outbreak of anti-foreign agitation began in the capital Chengdu, and thence spread throughout the province. The missionaries had no choice but to temporarily leave their posts. Work was resumed after their return in the spring of 1896. By the middle of the year 1900, the Church had 68 converts with some 200 names on the enquirers' roll. The year 1900 was marked by the anti-Christian uprising known as Boxer Rebellion. Although this unrest did not affect Sichuan so much as some other parts of China, missionaries were obliged by consular orders to retire to the coast. During their absence, the local converts defended their faith and carried on all the regular services. Two new stations were opened at Ningyuan and Chengdu in 1905 and 1909 respectively; while Rev. Joseph Taylor and his wife were transferred from Yazhou to Chengdu.

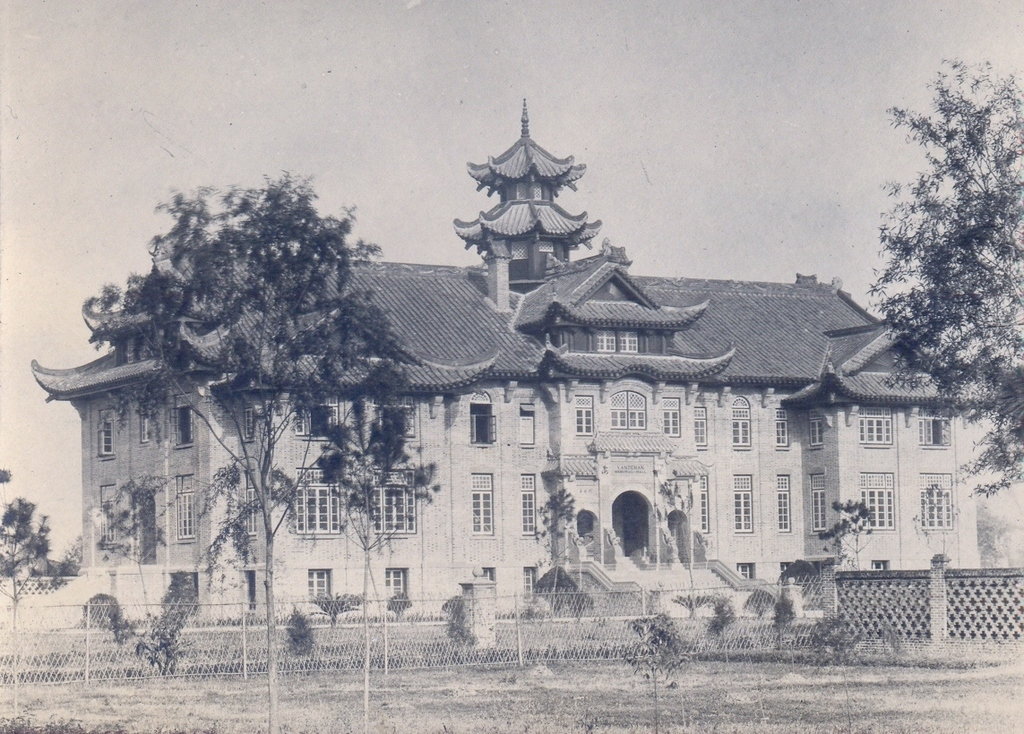
Van Dernan Hall, or the Baptist College at West China Union University, Chengdu, 1920.

In 1910, the ABMU changed its name to American Baptist Foreign Mission Society (ABFMS), and became one of the four founding societies of the West China Union University, together with American Methodist Episcopal Mission (Methodist Episcopal Church), Canadian Methodist Mission (Methodist Church of Canada), and Friends' Foreign Mission Association (British Quakers). Dr. William Reginald Morse helped found a medical school at the university. He later became dean of the medical school and also held positions at the university's Baptist College.

During the 1911 Revolution which overthrew the Qing dynasty, Openshaw took care of the wounded, with his wife as auxiliary. The local Christians later told of Mrs. Openshaw's bravery during the siege of Yazhou, how she would play the organ and sing while bullets whizzed about the house.

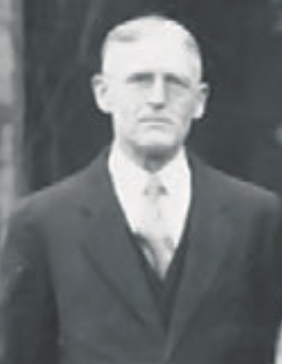
David Crockett Graham during a meeting of the Executive Committee of the West China Border Research Society in Chengdu, 1935.

In 1919, the ABFMS celebrated the thirtieth anniversary of its West China Mission. In 1920, Rev. A. G. Adams assumed responsibility for the work of the evangelistic field, which had been for several years under the direction of Rev. David Crockett Graham, a polymath Baptist minister who was ordained at the First Baptist Church of Fairport, New York, in 1911, and spent nearly forty years in Sichuan Province, arriving shortly after his ordination. He was also one of the key figures in the discovery of the archaeological site now known as Sanxingdui, when a collection of jade pieces contributed to the Museum of Art, Archaeology and Ethnology at the West China Union University by an English Anglican missionary, Vyvyan Donnithorne, in 1931, drew his attention, subsequently leading to an archaeological excavation in 1934.

By 1913, the American Baptists had 793 church members; and by the end of 1921, 1,263 members.

In 1924, a Swedish American missionary Esther Nelson was sent to Sichuan by the First Swedish Baptist Church of Minneapolis. Between 1924 and 1945, she worked primarily as a nurse and medical educator in various Baptist hospitals. She applied to become a full-time evangelist after the formation of the Baptist General Conference's Foreign Mission Board in 1945. This led her to the city of Huili in southwestern Sichuan at the end of 1947, where she worked until 1950, when foreign missionaries were driven out of China by the newly established communist government.

In 1938, Alfred James Broomhall, an English Baptist missionary, entered China through the China Inland Mission. In 1946, he entered the territory of the Independent Nosu (Nosuland) in southwestern Sichuan, with a team to establish a sustained Christian witness among them. He traveled to Zhaojue (Chaokioh) at first, and then to Xichang (Sichang), which were at the time part of "West" Kham Province. He was only able to live among the Nosu people from 1947 to 1951, and spent his last few months under house arrest before being expelled from China by communist regime; but his team was able to plant seeds that were going to bear fruit in coming decades.

== Since 1949 ==
After the communist takeover of China in 1949, Protestant Churches in the country were forced to sever their ties with respective overseas Churches, which then led to the merging of all the denominations into the communist-sanctioned Three-Self Patriotic Church. The China Christian Council was founded at the third national Christian conference in 1980 to unite and provide services for Protestant churches, formulating Church Order and encouraging theological education. In 2018, the detention of 100 Christians in Sichuan, including their pastor Wang Yi, raised concerns about religious crackdown in China.

The Cooperative Baptist Fellowship (CBF) and Hua Mei International (a non-profit Chinese Christian organization) provided critical relief supplies such as food, blankets and other necessities after the 2008 Sichuan earthquake. Two CBF field personnel Bill and Michelle Cayard also helped three pastors at a Protestant church in Bazhong with its growing congregation, which was ill-equipped to meet the needs of an increasing number of converts. The Cayards are planters of a congregation in Chengdu known as Thanksgiving Church. This congregation was founded in 2007 with support from the CBF Offering for Global Missions, its membership had increased from 30 in 2007 to 600 in 2017. Pastor and lay leader training programs were carried out under the guidance of the Cayards. The lack of well-trained pastors and church leaders has been a continuing problem in the Church in Sichuan.

== Surveys published in 1913 ==
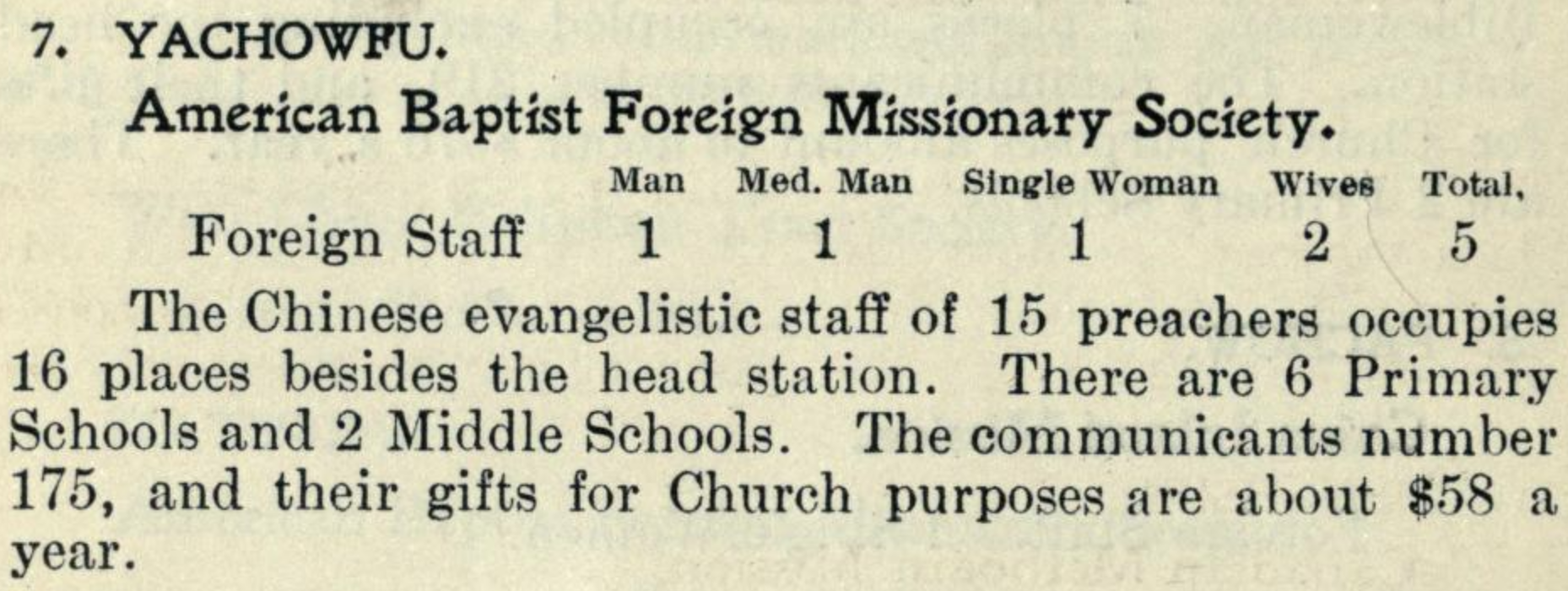
Baptist mission in Yazhou (Yachowfu)

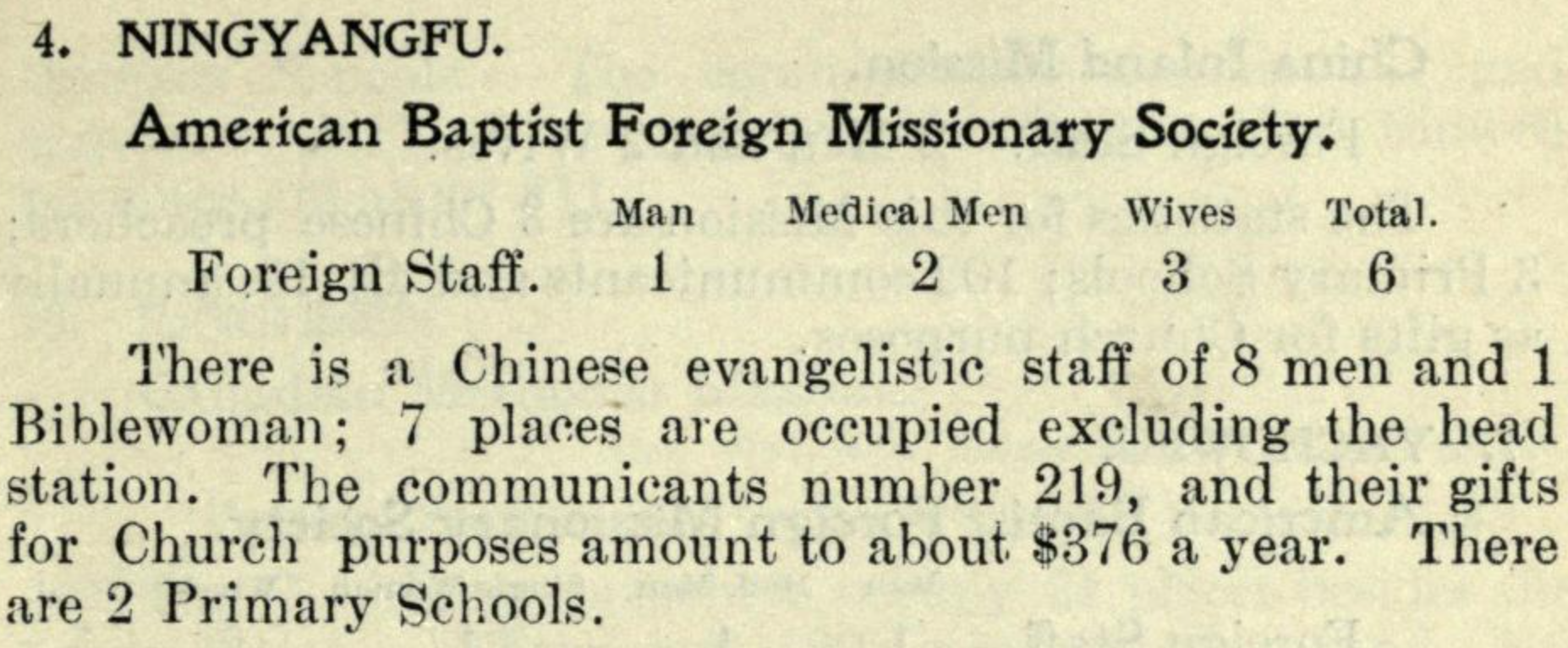
Baptist mission in Ningyuanfu

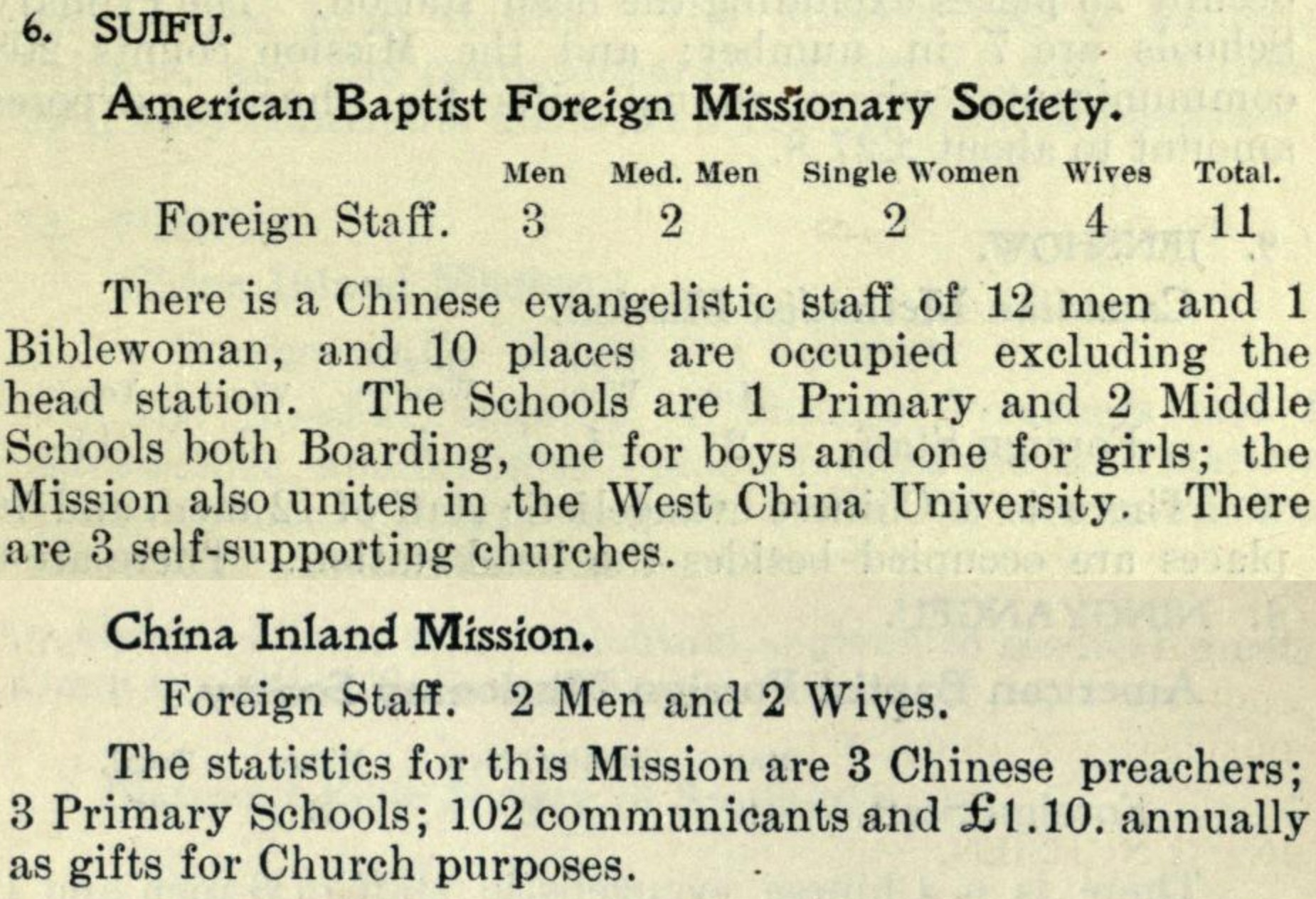
Protestant missions in Xuzhou (Suifu), including Baptist mission

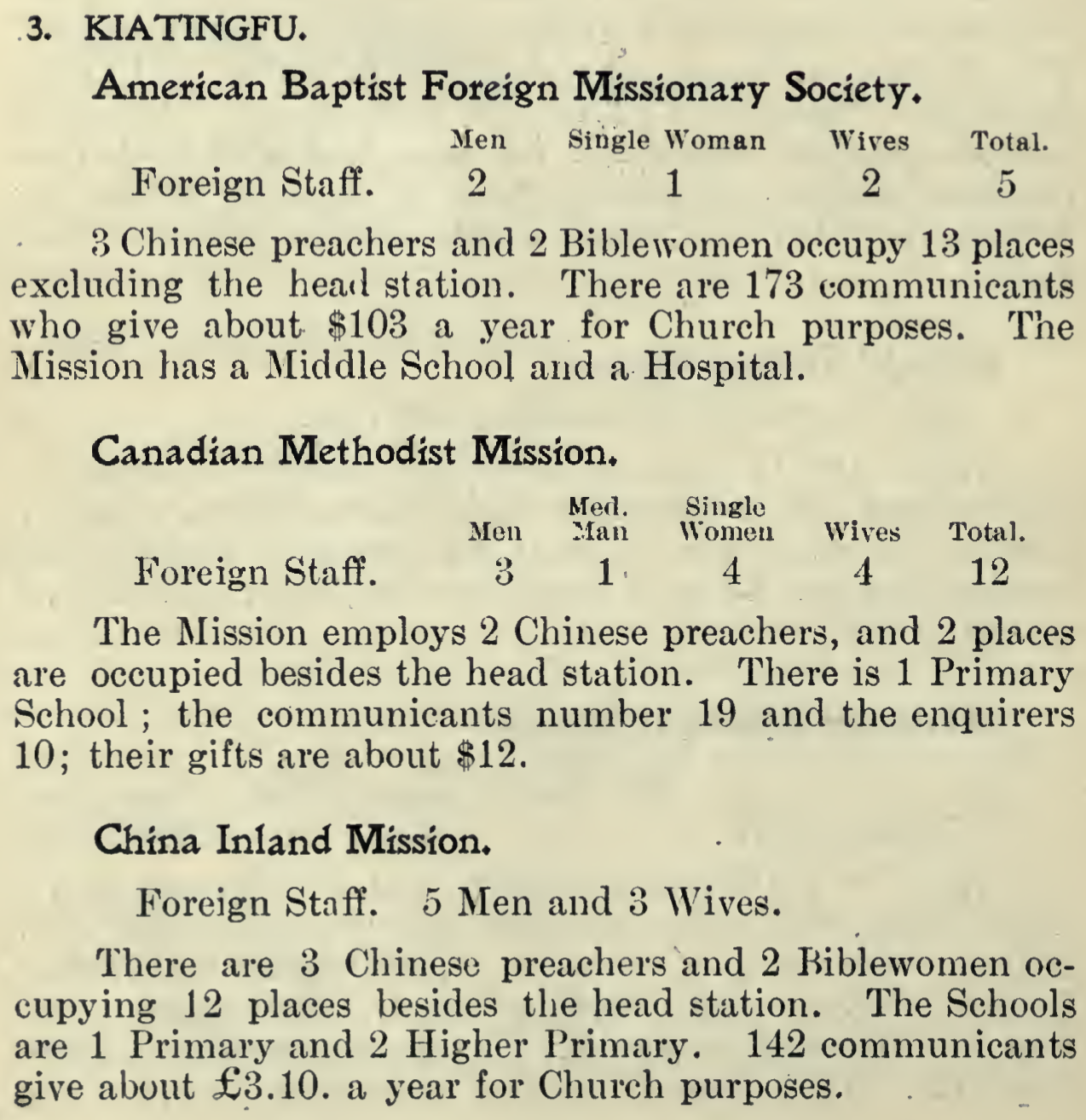
Protestant missions in Jiading (Kiatingfu), including Baptist mission

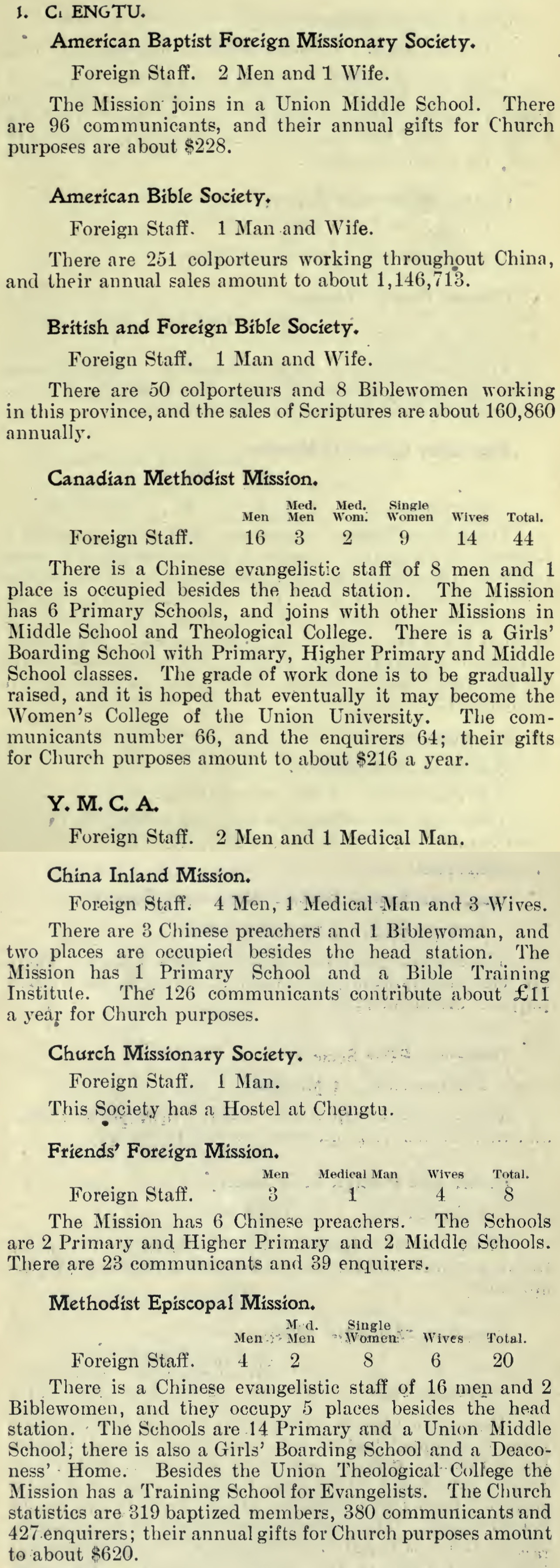
Protestant missions in Chengdu (Chengtu), including Baptist mission

== See also ==
- Christianity in Sichuan
  - Church of the East in Sichuan
  - Catholic Church in Sichuan
  - Protestantism in Sichuan
    - Anglicanism in Sichuan
    - Methodism in Sichuan
    - Quakerism in Sichuan
    - Seventh-day Adventist Church in Sichuan
- The West China Missionary News
- Anti-Christian Movement (China)
- Anti-missionary riots in China
- Antireligious campaigns of the Chinese Communist Party
- Denunciation Movement
- House church (China)
