= History of Adventism in Sichuan =

History and implantation of Adventism in Sichuan

The history of Adventism in Sichuan (Note: Sichuan, formerly romanized as Szechwan.) began in 1914 when American and Chinese missionaries arrived in Chongqing. Adventist missionaries in Sichuan were organized under the Szechwan Mission, later split into the East Szechwan, West Szechwan, and Tibetan Missions. Missionary activity in China generated controversy among many native Chinese and faced opposition from popular riots and the later Communist movement in China. Numerous mission properties and native Church leaders in Sichuan were respectively destroyed and killed by communists in the mid-1930s. Missionary activity ceased after the communist take over of China in 1949. Under government oppression in the 1950s, Adventist congregations and other Protestant Churches across China severed their ties with overseas Churches, and their congregations subsequently merged into the Three-Self Patriotic Church. Since 1980, their services have been provided by the China Christian Council.

== History ==
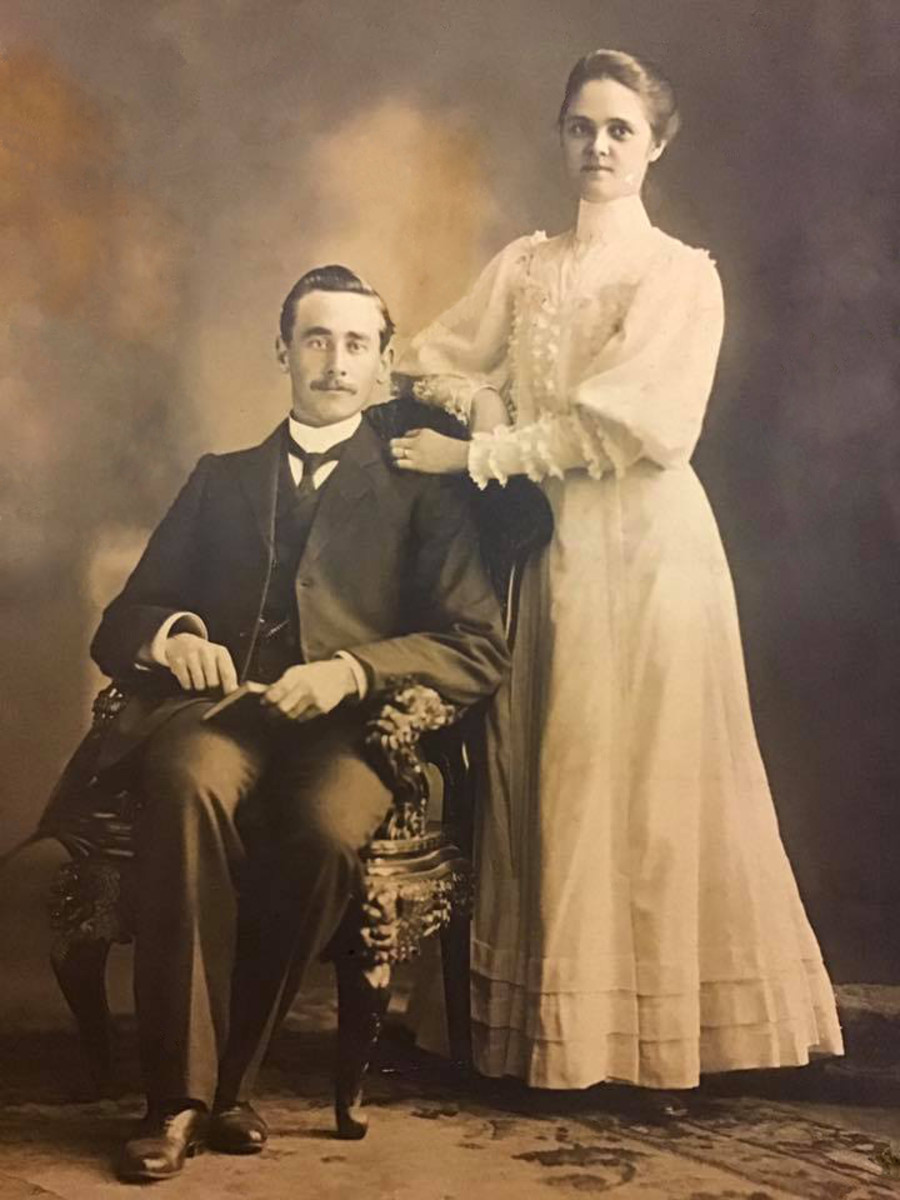
Francis Arthur Allum and Evaline Osborne were among the first Adventist missionaries to Sichuan.

Early in 1914, the Seventh-day Adventist Church (SDA) officials in China laid plans to establish a mission station in Sichuan, Francis Arthur Allum and Merritt C. Warren were chosen to be the mission's pioneers, accompanied by three Chinese staff members from Henan (Honan): Zhu Ziyi (Dju Dzi Ih; 朱子一), Shi Rulin (Shi Yung Gwei; 時汝霖) and Li Fakong (Li Fah Kung; 李法孔). The five men arrived in Chongqing (Chungking) and rented some quarters to construct a small chapel and bungalows for the mission staff. Meanwhile the Chinese staff members traveled around the city and its surrounding areas, securing hundreds of subscriptions to their monthly magazine Signs of the Times. Four persons were baptized on July 3, 1915. A second group of converts formed in a market town to the south of Chongqing. The SDA's Szechwan Mission (四川區會) was officially formed in 1917. In 1919, the mission was divided into East Szechwan Mission and West Szechwan Mission for easier administration. Merritt C. Warren became director of the East Szechwan Mission. Initially, the extreme west region was designated the Tibetan Mission headquartered at Tachienlu.

=== East Szechwan Mission ===
The East Szechwan Mission (東川區會) was centered in the city of Chongqing, where the SDA established its first mission station. From 1919 to 1921, church activities in Chongqing were restricted due to civil unrest. The East Szechwan Mission experienced very slow growth, between 1922 and 1925 the membership grew by only 20 individuals. In 1927, a German medical missionary Johann Heinrich Effenberg took a trip into the regions north of Chongqing, where he established 4 Sabbath Schools, opened 2 chapels, and baptized 24 individuals. In 1928 he reported that the mission had 7 outstations, 5 organized churches, 5 elementary schools with an enrollment of 70, and 11 Sabbath Schools with a total average attendance of 300 individuals. During the two-year period of 1927 to 1929, two Chinese workers were killed by brigands, another was imprisoned, a married couple were badly beaten, and a chapel was looted by Communist forces. At this time, a total baptized membership of 222 was reported by Effenberg. Dallas R. White succeeded Effenberg, he reported the number of baptized Adventists had risen to 534 by June 1933. During the Second World War the number dropped to 271, but rose to 656 in 1948, and reached the peak of 711 in 1951.

=== West Szechwan Mission ===
The West Szechwan Mission (西川區會) had its headquarters in the capital city of Chengdu (Chengtu). In 1917, Merritt C. Warren and Claude L. Blandford took an exploratory trip to Chengdu. After identifying some suitable rental premises for pioneer missionaries, Claude and Ida Blandford immediately began their work at Chengdu. A little church of 13 baptized members was gathered by mid-1919. In 1920, the mission established an out-station and an elementary school with 62 pupils, while church membership rose to 22 despite civil unrest in the region. Ida taught in the elementary school and nurtured Sabbath Schools. She contracted pneumonia and meningitis and died on May 5, 1922. In 1923, Sidney Henton Lindt became the mission's caretaker leader while Blandford returned to America on a furlough. In 1926, Alton Eugene Hughes assumed leadership of West Szechwan Mission. In 1927, Alton and Emma Hughes were driven out of Chengdu by a recurrent civil unrest, they were unable to return until about May 1928. Despite the troubles, the number of converts rose to 115. The mission gathered a second church and established seven out-stations. During the 1930s, the number of organized churches rose to four, and baptized membership increased to 236 in 1939. After the Second World War, several public evangelistic crusades injected fresh life into the congregations, but such flourishing period was brief, because Communist forces gradually overran the country and made it difficult for Christian missions to function properly. In 1946, Holman Carl Currie assumed the position of director of the West Szechwan Mission, but late in 1948, missionaries were ordered to evacuate Sichuan due to Communist threat. After Currie left for Taiwan, his assistant Zhan Tienong (Djan Tieh Nung; 湛鐵儂) continued with the mission work throughout 1948 and baptized about 50 new converts.

==== Tibetan Mission ====
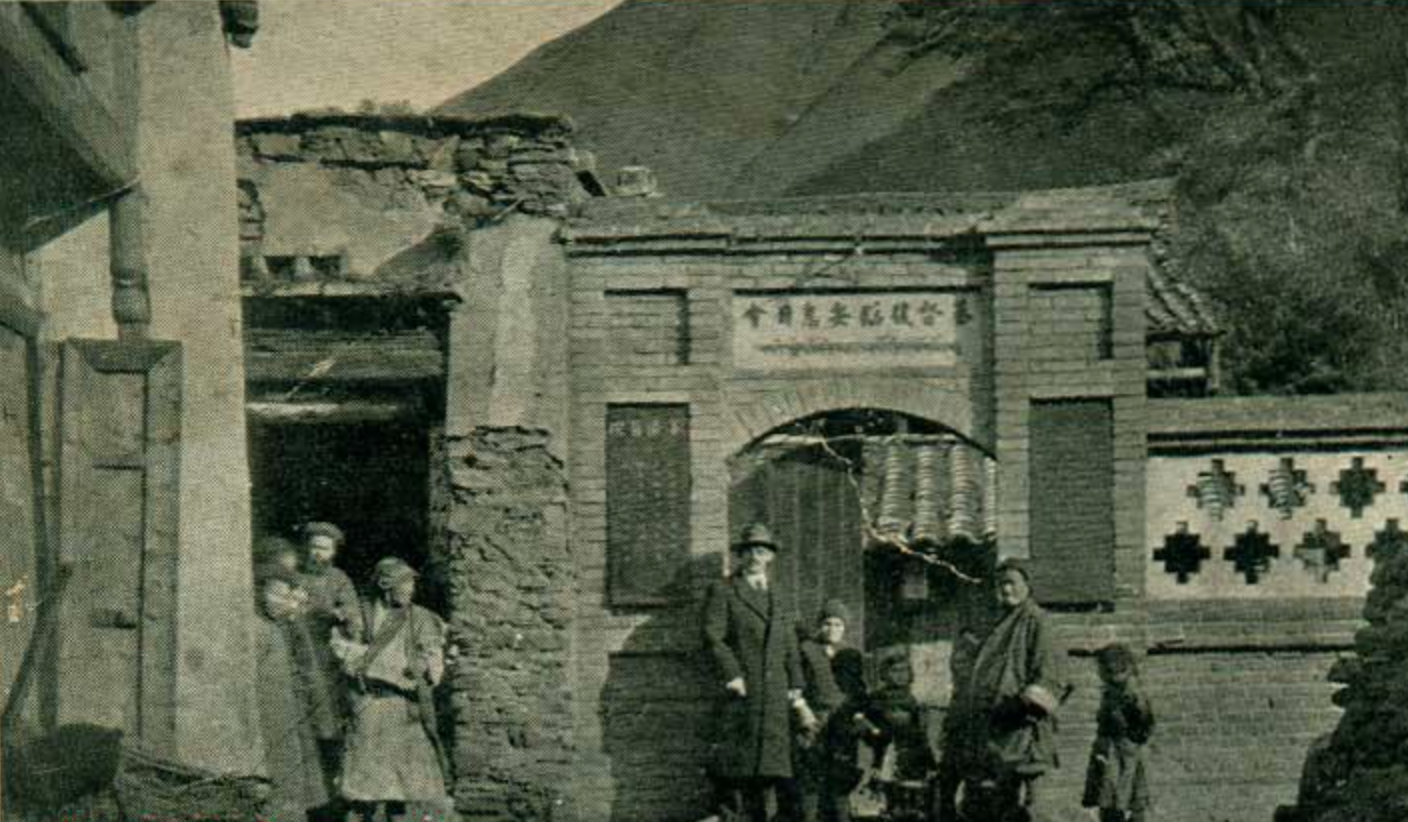
Dr. John Nevins Andrews with local converts standing outside the Adventist Church at Tachienlu, East Tibet, c. 1931.

The SDA administration regarded the mission in Chongqing as a stepping stone to entering Tibet, thus an exploratory trip further west to Chengdu was carried out in February 1917, in order to establish another stage in their Tibetan quest to eventually reaching Lhasa. The next year, a medical missionary John Nevins Andrews (grandson of Elder J. N. Andrews) and his wife Dorothy Spicer traveled to Tachienlu, an East Tibetan city located in West Sichuan. They started out in a drafty wooden house where the wind blew constantly. In 1921, several houses were built by the mission for general medical services. According to Dr. Andrews's report, an average of about 50 people went to him for medical treatment on a daily basis. The mission also printed exhortations and evangelistic leaflets in Tibetan language. The mission was not very fruitful in terms of conversion, because of the strong Buddhist presence in the region. In 1926, the missionaries welcomed their first three converts. By 1929, a church was organized with six baptized members.

== After 1949 ==
After the communist takeover of China in 1949, Protestant churches in the country were forced to sever their ties with respective overseas churches, which led to the merging of all the denominations into the communist-sanctioned Three-Self Patriotic Church. The 1952 Seventh-day Adventist Yearbook acknowledged that political circumstances made it impossible to accurately report any more mission activities in China. The China Christian Council was founded at the third national Christian conference in 1980 to unite and provide services for Protestant churches, formulating Church Order and encouraging theological education. In 2018, the detention of 100 Christians in Sichuan, including their pastor Wang Yi, raised concerns about religious crackdown in China.

On May 22, 2010, Rebekah Liu was ordained pastor for the church in her home province of Sichuan, which was started by her mother back in 1988. According to a 2012 report by Spectrum, there were over 10,000 Christians adhering to the Adventist tradition in Sichuan, with five ordained pastors, four of whom are women. Rebekah attended the first Women in Pastoral Ministry Conference in Papua New Guinea in September 2013, on which occasion she shared her life story as she struggled to go from a communist and evolutionist background to a full-time Seventh-day Adventist pastor in Chengdu.

As of 2023, there are 27 churches within the Adventist tradition: 13 in Shifang, 7 in Chengdu, 4 in Mianzhu, 2 in Dujiangyan, and 1 in Guanghan. The most notable one is the Huayang Adventist Church located in Shuangliu, Chengdu.

== Directors ==
=== East Szechwan Mission ===
- 1919–1923: Merritt C. Warren (汪和仁)
- 1923–1924: Ernest L. Lutz (盧德慈)
- 1924–1926: Alton Eugene Hughes (胡安德)
- 1926–1932: Johann Heinrich Effenberg (艾方伯)
- 1932–1935: Dallas R. White (懷德)
- 1936: George L. Wilkinson (韋更生)
- 1937–1939: Cecil Bennett Guild (蓋乃德)
- 1939–1940: Zhang Zhenqiang (Djang Djen-chiang; 張振強)
- 1941: Cecil Bennett Guild (蓋乃德)
- 1942–1948: Liu Fuan (Liu Fu-an; 劉福安)
- 1948–1950: Ge Zhao'e (Goh Chiao Oh; 葛肇諤)
- 1951: Qiu Qixiu (Chiu Chi Hsiu; 邱其修)

=== West Szechwan Mission ===
- 1919–1926: Claude Lockyer Blandford (巴慶安)
- 1926–1932: Alton Eugene Hughes (胡安德)
- 1932–1933: Charles A. Woolsey
- 1933–1939: Alexander Blackburn Buzzell (卜思理)
- 1940–1942: Cecil Bennett Guild (蓋乃德)
- 1943–1946: Jiang Congguang (Giang Tsung Kwang 姜從光)
- 1946–1948: Holman Carl Currie (柯爾義)
- 1949–1951: Zhan Tienong (Djan Tieh Nung; 湛鐵儂)

== See also ==
- Christianity in Sichuan
  - Church of the East in Sichuan
  - Catholic Church in Sichuan
  - Protestantism in Sichuan
    - Anglicanism in Sichuan
    - Methodism in Sichuan
    - Quakerism in Sichuan
    - Baptist Christianity in Sichuan
- Anti-Christian Movement (China)
- Anti-missionary riots in China
- Antireligious campaigns of the Chinese Communist Party
- Denunciation Movement
- House church (China)
- General Conference of Seventh-day Adventists
- History of the Seventh-day Adventist Church
- Signs of the Times Publishing Association (Taiwan)
