= First Baptist Church of Denver =

Historic church in Denver, Colorado

- U.S. National Register of Historic Places
- U.S. Historic district – Contributing property
- Colorado State Register of Historic Properties
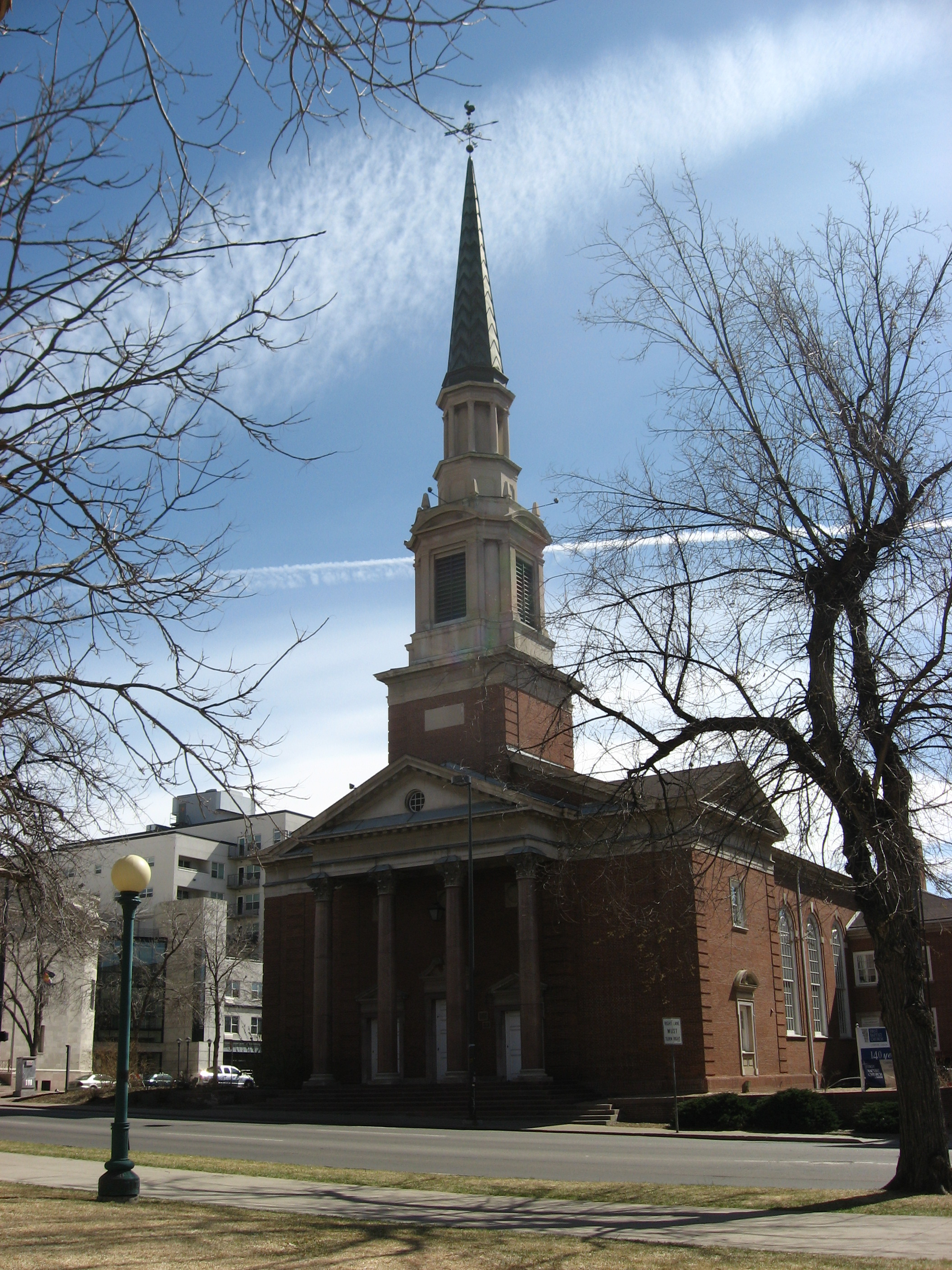

- Location within Colorado Location within the United States
- Location: 230 E. 14th Av.--1373 Grant St., Denver, Colorado
- Coordinates: 39°44′18″N 104°59′1″W
- Area: Less than one acre
- Built: 1935-1938
- Architect: G. Meridith Musick
- Architectural style: Georgian Revival
- Part of: Civic Center Historic District (ID74002348)
- NRHP reference No.: 05001088
- CSRHP No.: 5DV.803

Significant dates
- Added to NRHP: September 28, 2005
- Designated CP: February 27, 1974

First Baptist Church of Denver is an historic church at 230 E. 14th Avenue-1373 Grant Street in Denver, Colorado. First Baptist Church of Denver ("FBCD") was formally organized in 1864, six years after the city's founding.

After serving its community in several places in Denver's downtown, its congregation's current building is located at the intersection of 14th Avenue and Grant Street, directly across from the south steps of the Colorado State Capitol. The church was designed by well-known and prolific Denver architect, G. Meredith Musick, who designed the church in the Georgian architectural style. Among other works, Musick was a co-designer of the U.S. Customshouse in Denver. The construction of the church took place between 1935 and 1938.

It sports giant columns in its portico, built from granite quarried in Lyons, Colorado. They were turned and hand-polished on a lathe on site. Upon completion, they were the largest polished granite columns in Colorado.

It was listed on the National Register of Historic Places in 1974 as a contributing building within the Civic Center Historic District, and it was further individually added again to the National Register in 2005.

Reflective of FBCD's historic involvement in social justice, the Reverend Doctor Martin Luther King, Jr. preached from FBCD's pulpit on April 16, 1962.
