= Homosexuality and Quakerism =

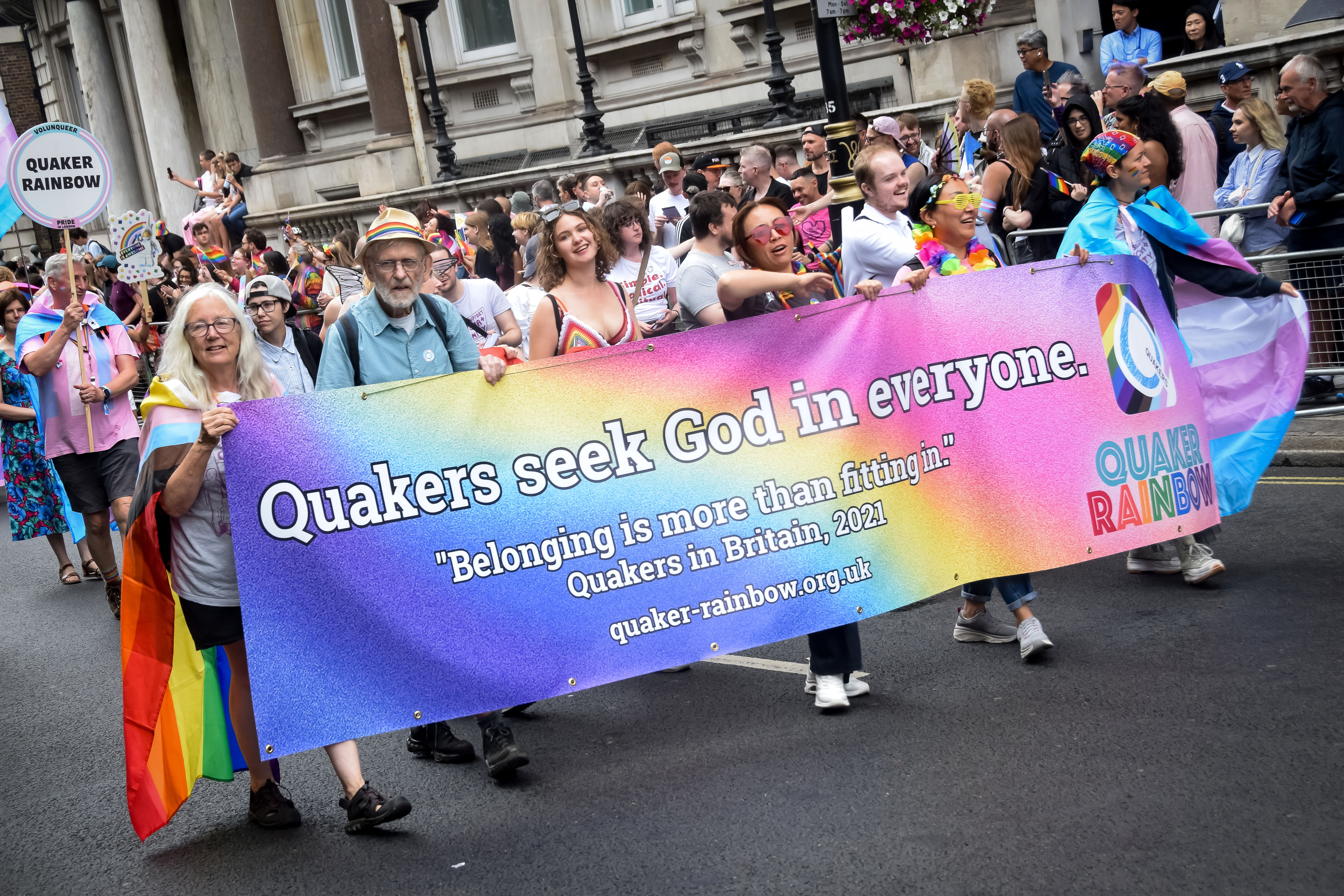
Quakers at Pride in London 2025

The views of Quakers around the world towards homosexuality encompass a range from complete celebration and the practice of same-sex marriage, to the view that homosexuality is sinfully deviant and contrary to God's intentions for sexual expression. The Religious Society of Friends (Quakers) is a historically Christian religious movement founded in 17th-century England; it has around 350,000 members. In Britain, Canada, New Zealand and Australia, many Quakers are supportive of homosexual relationships, while views are divided among U.S. meetings. Many Conservative Friends and Holiness Friends, both of which have retained traditional Quaker practices such as plain dress, along with Evangelical Friends, view homosexual acts as sinful. 49% of Quakers live in Africa, and though views may differ, the Kenyan Church of Friends does not support homosexual relationships.

== Friends' policy and decision-making ==
Since Quaker decision making is generally based on seeking "unity" at the level of a Monthly meeting (convened periodically for business, and more often for worship, and is the basic unit of Quakerism – a meeting is equivalent to a single congregation, sometimes to a parish or group of churches in an area), determining a particular Quaker attitude is difficult on this or any topic. Monthly meetings are organized into larger groups such as Yearly meetings or other "umbrella" groups, but often these larger groups have conflicting stances on particular issues. Some groups, for example the 57th Street Meeting in Chicago, may have joint membership in umbrella groups that have mutually contradictory stances on the issues. In the end, the true "Quaker view" on homosexuality is probably best analysed meeting by meeting (or, better, Friend by Friend). However, there are some general patterns, and for reasons of space and completeness this article deals mainly with the largest organizations on a country-by-country basis. Until the 1960s the topic of homosexuality was untouched among Quakers. London Yearly Meeting's publication of Towards a Quaker View of Sex, including norms for sexual relations that were inclusive of equitable same-sex relations, provoked on-going questioning. By the time the first same-sex relationship was taken under the care of a Friends meeting in 1982 (University MM, North Pacific Yearly Meeting, Seattle, Washington) the scene was set for ongoing discernment and disagreement.

Quakers as a whole do not have a specific, set creed. The Richmond Declaration is a confession of faith that expresses the experience of two branches of American Quakerism, but does not reflect the views of others.

== By region ==
=== Oceania ===
==== Australia ====
Just over two-fifths of Quakers in Australia are members of the Australia Yearly Meeting who are accepting of homosexuality. In 1975 Australia Yearly Meeting officially stated:

The Religious Society of Friends (Quakers) in Australia calls for a change in the laws ... to eliminate discrimination against homosexuals. This statement is made in the light of the Society's desire to remove discrimination and persecution in the community. The Society also calls on all people to seek more knowledge and understanding of the diversity of human relationships and to affirm the worth of love in all of them.

Many Australian Quakers have supported the celebration of same sex and different sex commitment ceremonies since 1994 and recognize them on an equal basis with other committed and loving relationships. In January 2010, Quakers meeting in Australia Yearly Meeting in Adelaide agreed to treat all requests for marriages in accordance with Quaker traditions, regardless of the sexual orientation or gender of the partners. Before this Australia-wide decision, Canberra Regional Meeting celebrated the first same sex marriage among Australian Quakers on 15 April 2007.

==== New Zealand ====
In New Zealand, the yearly meeting Te Hāhi Tūhauwiri, in 1992, resolved "to seek formal ways of recognizing a variety of commitments, including gay and lesbian partnerships".

=== Europe ===
==== Ireland ====
Ireland Yearly Meeting, which includes meetings in Northern Ireland, permits same-sex marriages to take place within their meetings. However, no individual Friend or Meeting is required to take part in these marriages if it offends their conscience.

==== United Kingdom ====
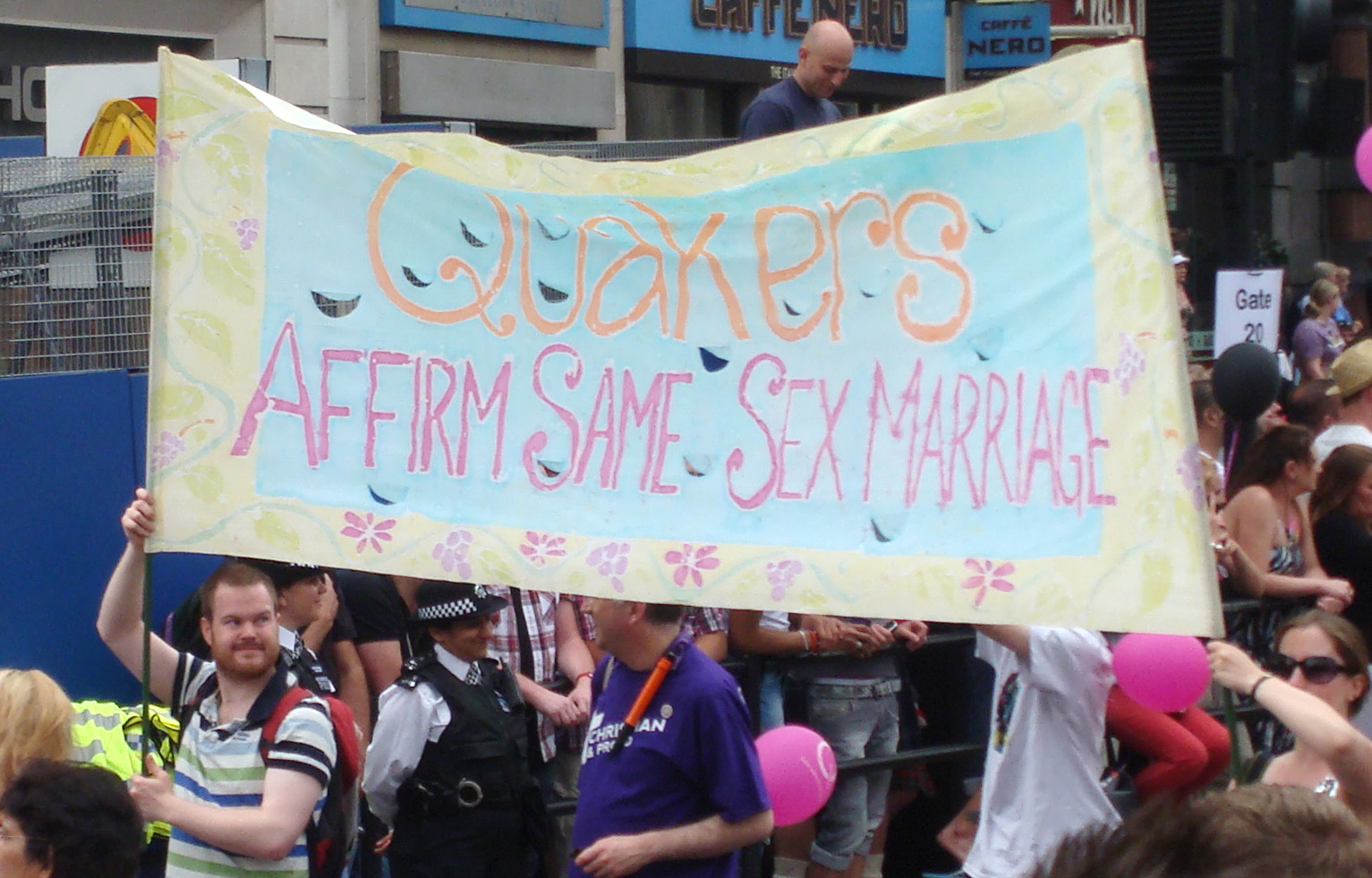
Quakers supporting gay marriage at Pride London 2011

Quakers were one of the first churches to talk openly about sexuality ... We feel that the quality and depth of feeling between two people is the most important part of a loving relationship, not their gender or sexual orientation.

— Quakers in Britain, FAQ

Britain Yearly Meeting formally minuted support for same-sex marriage in 2009 and began to centrally lobby the government for the necessary legal changes. The decision was taken 22 years after being first raised at Meeting for Sufferings, and 46 years after the publication of "Towards a Quaker View of Sex". Controversial in its day, the book forms one of the first Quaker statements regarding sexuality, and includes affirmation that gender or sexual orientation are unimportant in a judgement of an intimate relationship and that the true criterion is the presence of "selfless love"; further consideration arose from Harvey Gillman's Swarthmore Lecture, in 1988.

Before the legalisation of same-sex marriage, some Friends (both opposite-sex and same-sex) celebrated their relationships in a Meeting for Worship with a Celebration of Commitment. Britain Yearly Meeting supported the Marriage (Same Sex Couples) Act 2013, which legalised secular and religious same-sex marriages in England and Wales.

=== North America ===
==== United States ====
Quakers in the United States are divided on the issue of homosexuality, with some (mostly Friends affiliated with programmed meetings) not approving of either homosexuality or the legalization of same sex unions. Friends associated with Friends General Conference (FGC), the more liberal group of Friends encompassing a large number of yearly meetings and approximately a fifth of all Quakers in the country, are the most tolerant with many monthly meetings and some yearly meetings providing full equality for homosexuals including marriage. FGC itself in 2004 made a statement on including LGBT quakers as equals in worship and acknowledging their past contributions to the conference. The largely FGC-based FLGBTQC (Friends for Lesbian, Gay, Bisexual, Transgender, and Queer Concerns) group holds meetings twice a year.

Similar positions from other unprogrammed Quaker meetings not affiliated with FGC include that taken by North Pacific Yearly Meeting and Pacific Yearly Meeting, which support same-sex marriage.

On the other hand, Friends associated with the Central Yearly Meeting of Friends (CYMF), Friends United Meeting (FUM) and Evangelical Friends Church International (EFCI), which represent mostly programmed Quaker meetings, have taken stands condemning gay marriage and homosexual relationships altogether. Indiana and Western Yearly Meetings (members of FUM) issued a statement of "core values" which includes both an insistence on abstinence outside of marriage, and a definition of marriage to heterosexual relationships only, as does the Central Yearly Meeting of Friends in its Manual of Faith and Practice. Evangelical Friends Church - Southwest, a yearly meeting and a member of EFI, states in its Faith and Practice that homosexuality is a sin and grounds for termination of employment in the church.

However, there is dissension within the Evangelical groups. The Friends of Jesus Community, some of whose members were affiliated with EFCI, took a public stance in favor of the equal worth of same-sex relationships. In Northwest Yearly Meeting of Friends Church (NWYM), associated with EFCI, one Portland-area Monthly Meeting has minuted its support of same-sex unions, creating a discussion on their statement of human sexuality. This led to a number of other NWYM churches discussing this matter, leading some of them to form a new yearly meeting, and at least one of them to split.

Most monthly meetings of Baltimore Yearly Meeting (BYM, a member of both FGC and FUM) have taken a similar position. Similarly, although perhaps to a lesser extent, some meetings associated with groups on the other side of the issue have dissented. Swansea Monthly Meeting, under care of New England Yearly Meeting, is one of two meetings in that group to publicly oppose same-sex marriage.

In 2002, FUM and BYM began a dialogue on homosexuality and same-sex relationships. At the 2002 FUM Triennial, Clerk Lamar Matthew was excluded from leading a worship sharing group because he was in a relationship with another man. FUM has affirmed in a minute of its General Board that its policy that anyone in sexual relationships outside of marriage – "which is understood to be between one man and one woman" – cannot be in paid leadership positions (a minute approved in 1988) also applies to those in other leadership positions and to their overseas workers. Since that time, BYM has had a program of intervisitation with other Yearly Meetings on the issue of same-sex relationships. This policy of FUM has been in constant discussion in the FUM board ever since it was originally proposed. BYM is not the only dual-membership Yearly Meeting (membership in both FUM and FGC). Many members of the New England and New York Yearly Meetings have also been struggling with the FUM position.

==== Canada ====
In Canada, the main "umbrella" Quaker body, Canadian Yearly Meeting, shares a similar view to the more liberal American Quaker groups, and stated in 2003 that Canadian Quakers "support the right of same-sex couples to a civil marriage and the extension of the legal definition of marriage to include same-sex couples." Since then a number of same-sex marriages have been performed at Canadian Monthly Meetings. CYM is a member of both FUM and FGC. As a result of FUM's position on homosexuality, there is ongoing debate within Canadian Yearly Meeting about CYM's relationship with FUM. Canadian Yearly Meeting in 2007 approved a letter to be sent to FUM stating that CYM has appointed a committee "to review the involvement and participation of CYM in FUM". In the meantime, CYM's financial contribution was earmarked for a specific purpose.

=== In other countries ===
The majority of Quakers live in countries not mentioned above. Kenya, for example, has a Quaker population larger than that of any other country. The Friends Church in Kenya "condemns homosexuality".

Generally in Africa and Latin America, most meetings are programmed and under the care of either FUM or EFI although meetings in Central and Southern Africa are unprogrammed; in Asia, many of the meetings are unprogrammed and have connections with more liberal groups elsewhere in the world.

African Friends in general are supportive of the position taken by FUM. In 2007, at the first meeting of FUM held in Africa, the clerk of Uganda Yearly Meeting delivered a devotional in which he quoted Romans 1:8–32, saying that "homosexuals and even those who support them are worthy of death." Although in a later letter of apology he said that he was referring to spiritual death, many more liberal Quakers found his comments hateful.

== See also ==
- Bayard Rustin, gay rights activist
- Friends for Lesbian, Gay, Bisexual, Transgender, and Queer Concerns
- Testimony of equality

== Sources ==
- Hartman, Keith. Congregations in Conflict: The Battle over Homosexuality. New Brunswick, NJ: Rutgers University Press, 1996.
