= Elfrida Vipont =

English children's writer (1902–1992)

Elfrida Vipont Brown
- Born: 3 July 1902; Manchester, England
- Died: 14 March 1992 (aged 89)
- Occupations: Writer, educator
- Spouse: R. Percy Foulds (m.1926)
- Writing career
- Pen name: Charles Vipont, Elfrida Vipont, E. V. Foulds
- Period: 1930–1987
- Genres: Children's literature, biography, history, music
- Notable works: The Lark in the Morn; The Lark on the Wing; The Elephant and the Bad Baby

Elfrida Vipont Brown (3 July 1902 – 14 March 1992) was an English writer of children's literature. She was born in Manchester into a family of Quakers. As a children's writer, she initially published under a man's name, Charles Vipont, which was a common marketing device by publishers at the time. She later wrote as Elfrida Vipont, and after her marriage sometimes as E. V. Foulds. She was also a schoolteacher and a prominent Quaker.

== Early life ==
Born in Manchester on 3 July 1902, Elfrida Brown was the youngest of the three children of Edward Vipont Brown (1863–1955), a general practitioner and Dorothy Brown (née Crowley) (1874–1968).

She was educated at Manchester High School for Girls and The Mount School, York, which were not unlike the "Chesterham High School" and "Heryot School" she portrayed in The Lark in the Morn. After a time of reading history at Manchester University, she realized that what she really wanted to sing, and went on to study it with teachers in London, Paris and Leipzig and to work as a freelance writer and lecturer.

In 1926, Vipont married R. Percy Foulds, a research technologist. They had four daughters. She started her writing career during their early years.

During World War II she was headmistress of an Evacuation School set up by Quakers in Manchester at Liverpool and Yealand Conyers, a small village in Lancashire, where children from those cities and from further afield were sent for safety, away from the wartime bombing. Three of her own daughters were pupils at the school.

Elfrida Foulds had already published three books for children before the war. After it was over she became a writer in many fields, with interests in history, Quakerism and music. She wrote nearly two dozen novels, stories and anthologies for children and young adults, including The Lark on the Wing, which won the Carnegie Medal in 1951.

== Service to Quakers ==
Elfrida Fouldes was a lifelong member of the Religious Society of Friends (Quakers). She served on the Meeting for Sufferings of London Yearly Meeting (an executive committee) from 1939 to 1985; from 1969 to 1974 she was its Clerk. She also served on the Friends Service Council, the Friends Education Council, the Library Committee and the Friends Historical Society Executive Committee. She was also a long-serving member of the Ackworth School Committee. She also served on the committee that arranged for British Quakers' Yearly Meeting, and participated in the revision of the Quaker Book of Discipline. Elfrida Foulds lived for many years at Yealand Conyers, while travelling worldwide for Quaker committees and lecturing in schools and libraries.

== Writing career ==
Elfrida Fouldes wrote "serious books" about Quakerism, some under her married name E. V. Foulds. One was her first published book, Quakerism: An International Way of Life (1930).

She used a man's pen name, Charles Vipont, to write adventure stories for boys (first in 1939); that was a common marketing device by Oxford University Press and other publishers of female authors. The Heir of Craigs (Oxford, 1955) is a historical novel set in Britain and North America late in the 17th century. Nigel Craig, the son of an aristocratic family, "escapes" on adventure with a cousin. Along with "a band of steadfast and resourceful Quakers", they are shipwrecked in the New World and they meet hostile natives.

As "Elfrida Vipont", she wrote about two dozen books for children (and other works), including short biographies of the authors Charlotte Brontë, George Eliot, and Jane Austen, published by Hamish Hamilton between 1965 and 1977. A number of her books were published by Gazelle Books and Reindeer Books, Hamish Hamilton's imprints for younger children.

Her best-known books are The Lark in the Morn (1948) and The Lark on the Wing (1950), published by Oxford University Press. For the latter she won the annual Carnegie Medal from the Library Association, recognising the year's best children's book by a British subject. The Lark books were five family stories following the musical career of Kit Haverard. The three other novels continuing this Lark /Haverard series are The Spring of the Year (1957), Flowering Spring (1960), and The Pavilion (1969).

Fouldes and the illustrator Raymond Briggs collaborated on a picture book for young children, The Elephant and the Bad Baby, published by Hamish Hamilton in 1969. Probably it is her most famous work; by a wide margin, as it is the one most widely held in WorldCat participating libraries. It features a baby who refuses to say please and goes romping through town on the back of an elephant while being chased by various townspeople. The Elephant and the Bad Baby is a "cumulative story" with a "poetic feel", a common effect drawn from the picture-book format of the text.

== Later life ==
Elfrida Foulds lived for many years at Yealand Conyers, Lancashire, where she was an active participant in community affairs, while travelling worldwide for Quaker committees and lecturing in schools and libraries. She died in 1992.

== Legacy ==
Elfrida Foulds' personal papers are at the John Rylands University Library of Manchester.

== Publications ==
- Quakerism: An International Way of Life (1930), as E. V. Foulds
- Good Adventure: The Quest for Music in Britain (Manchester: J. Heywood, 1931), illustrated by Estella Canziani
- Colin Writes to Friends House (Friends’ Book Centre, 1934; 2nd ed. revised, 1946)
- Blow the Man Down ... (1939), as Charles Vipont, illus. Norman Hepple — published with "The fighting sailor turn'd peaceable Christian", the narrative of Thomas Lurting's conversion to Quaker Christianity, first printed in 1710
- The Lark in the Morn (Oxford, 1948), illus. T. R. Freeman ‡
- The Lark on the Wing (Oxford, 1950), illus. T. R. Freeman ‡
- A Lily among Thorns: some passages in the life of Margaret Fell of Swarthmoor Hall (Friends Home Service Committee, 1950)
- Sparks among the Stubble (Oxford, 1950; FHSC, 1971, illus. Patricia M. Lambe —short stories
- The Birthplace of Quakerism: a handbook for the 1652 country (1952), as E. V. Foulds; 5th revised ed., Quaker Home Service, 1997)
- Let Your Lives Speak: a key to Quaker experience (Wallingford, Pennsylvania: Pendle Hill, 1953; Pendle Hill pamphlets #71)
- The Story of Quakerism: through three centuries (1954; 2nd ed., London: Bannisdale Press, 1960; 3rd, 1977)
- Arnold Rowntree: a life (Bannisdale Press, 1955) — about Arnold Stephenson Rowntree
- The Family at Dowbiggins (Lutterworth Press, 1955), illus. T. R. Freeman •
- The Heir of Craigs (Oxford, 1955), as Charles Vipont, illus. Tessa Theobold
- Living in the Kingdom (1955)
- The High Way: an anthology (1957), as E. Vipont, compiler
- The Secret of Orra (Basil Blackwell, 1957), with illustrations
- The Spring of the Year (Oxford, 1957), illus. T. R. Freeman ‡
- Bless This Day: a book of prayer for children (Harcourt, 1958), as E. Vipont, compiler; illus. Harold Jones
- More about Dowbiggins (1958); later A Win for Henry Conyers (Hamilton, 1968), illus. T.R. Freeman •
- Ackworth School, from its foundation in 1779 to the introduction of co-education in 1946 (Lutterworth Press, 1959)
- Henry Purcell and His Times (1959) – about Henry Purcell
- Changes at Dowbiggins (1960); later, Boggarts and Dreams (1969)
- Flowering Spring (1960) ‡
- The Story of Christianity in Britain (Michael Joseph, 1960), illus. Gaynor Chapman
- What about Religion? (Museum Press, 1961), illus. Peter Roberson
- The Bridge: an anthology (1962), as E. Vipont, compiler, illustrated with 10 wood block engravings by Trevor Brierley Lofthouse
- A Faith to Live By (1962)
- Search for a Song (Oxford, 1962), illus. Peter Edwards
- Some Christian Festivals: to which is appended a brief glossary of Christian terminology (London: Michael Joseph, 1963)
- Larry Lopkins (Hamilton, 1965), illus. Pat Marriott
- The Offcomers (1965), illus. Janet Duchesne
- Rescue for Mittens (Hamilton, 1965), illus. Jane Paton
- Stevie (Hamilton, 1965), illus. Raymond Briggs
- Quakerism: a Faith to Live By (Bannisdale Press, 1966)
- Terror by Night: a book of strange stories (1966)
- Weaver of Dreams: the girlhood of Charlotte Brontë (Hamilton, 1966)
- A Child of the Chapel Royal (University Press, 1967), illus. John Lawrence
- The China Dog (Hamilton, 1967), illus. Constance Marshall
- The Secret Passage (Hamilton, 1967), illus. Ian Ribbons
- The Elephant and the Bad Baby (Hamilton, 1969), illus. Raymond Briggs
- Michael and the Dogs (1969)
- The Pavilion (Oxford, 1969), illus. Prudence Seward ‡
- Children of the Mayflower (New York: Franklin Watts, 1970), illus. Evadne Rowan
- Towards a High Attic: the early life of George Eliot (Hamilton, 1970)
- Bed in Hell (Hamilton, 1974)
- George Fox and the Valiant Sixty (Hamilton, 1975) – about the Quaker founder George Fox
- A Little Bit of Ivory: a life of Jane Austen (Hamilton, 1977)
- So Numerous a Family: 200 years of Quaker education at Ackworth, 1779–1979 (1979), by Vipont and Edward H. Milligan
- The Candle of the Lord (1983)
- Why Young Friends? (1987)

‡ The Lark in the Morn (1948) inaugurated a series of five books (1948–1969), according to Collecting Books and Magazines. Its first sequel, The Lark on the Wing (1950), was called "second of three" in a 1970 review by Kirkus.
• The Family at Dowbiggins (1955) inaugurated a series of three books (1955–1960), according to Collecting Books and Magazines.
