= Book of Discipline (Quaker) =

Church manual

A Book of Discipline may refer to one of the various books issued by a Yearly Meeting of the Religious Society of Friends, setting out what it means to be a Quaker in that Yearly Meeting. The common name for this book varies from one Yearly Meeting to another and includes Book of Discipline, Faith and Practice, Christian Faith and Practice, Quaker Faith and Practice, Church Government and Handbook of Practice and Procedure. Each Book of Discipline is updated periodically by each Yearly Meeting according to the usual practice of decision making within the Religious Society of Friends.

== Text and usage ==
The contents of each book of discipline is agreed on by seeking unity among members of the authoring yearly meeting. Instead of voting or seeking an earthly consensus, the Meeting attempts to gain a sense of God's will for the community. Each member of the meeting is expected to listen to that of God within themselves and, if led, to contribute it to the group for reflection and consideration. Each member listens to others' contributions carefully, in an attitude of seeking Truth rather than of attempting to prevail or to debate. This process can be tedious and lengthy. Nevertheless, this is thought to be the best way of reflecting the breadth of Quaker theology and practice, and is consistent with an intention that they be based in evolving personal experience and 'inner light' rather than fixed creeds. The writings are not intended to represent strict rules which followers must agree with or adhere to, but may be used as a source of guidance or discipline. Since the majority of the Society remains within a Christian theistic tradition, this is typically reflected in the publication.

Extracts from the book are sometimes read aloud in Quaker meetings for worship, or may be reflected upon individually.

== History ==
The Quakers are today almost the only survivors from the many religious groups that sprang up in the religious and social ferment of the English Civil War (1642–1649). They survived and flourished largely through the practical wisdom of a young man whose spiritual experiences and insights launched the movement. His name was George Fox. At the age of nineteen he entered a troubled period in which he found no spiritual help. Leaving home, he wandered for four years, consulting priests and non-conformist ministers. Having reached the point of near despair, he had a vivid spiritual experience, as he wrote in his Journal: "When my hopes in all men were gone...then O then I heard a voice which said "There is one, even Christ Jesus that can speak to thy condition". And when I heard it, my heart did leap for joy."

Feeling the call to preach he met a group of former Baptists, and together they called themselves "The Children of Light". Over the years, moving from the English Midlands into Yorkshire, Fox was accepted by a group of Seekers. As time went on they began to refer to themselves as "Friends in the Truth", and it is this that gives us the official name of the "Religious Society of Friends". The term "Quakers", which sometimes appears in brackets after the official name, comes from an insult used by a magistrate in Derby when he was sentencing some Friends for being non-conformist (Fox had bidden him to "tremble at the word of the Lord").

On 13 June 1652 George Fox addressed a crowd of about a thousand people on a hilltop called Firbank Fell in Northern England close to the English Lake District. This event is often considered to be the founding event of the Quaker faith. The rock on which he stood is referred to as Fox's Pulpit. Two weeks later in Ulverston, he met Margaret Fell while preaching in the church there. Margaret and her husband Thomas (a Justice of the Peace and later Member of Parliament) by the greatest good fortune took George Fox into their home, Swarthmoor Hall, and protected him, while the Valiant Sixty of newly converted Quakers ranged far and wide across England, spreading the good news of a simpler form of Christian faith. Some time after Thomas Fell died, Margaret and George were married.

While other religious groups of the period faded away with time, Fox devoted himself in 1666–1668 to setting up a structure of meetings which has remained virtually the same up until the present day: local 'particular' meetings, grouped regionally into "monthly meetings", "quarterly meetings" above them, and an annual "General Assembly of the Brethren" (usually referred to as a Yearly Meeting) as the leading authority. There has been a national annual meeting of some sort in Britain every year since 1668.

=== United Kingdom ===
The earliest statement of Christian discipline was the Epistle from the meeting of Elders at Balby, in 1656. This was a list of twenty advices as to how Friends should conduct themselves, formed following a meeting of prominent Seekers at Balby in Yorkshire, and is seen by many as the defining document founding Quakerism.

The Canons and institutions drawn up and agreed upon by the General Assembly or Meeting of the heads of the Quakers from all parts of the kingdom was produced following a meeting of leading Quakers in London in 1669. This had been drafted by George Fox, the name Canons and Institutions had been given to the publication by his opponents. It contained general advices and regulations, and was the basis of future books of discipline, although the name was formally disclaimed by Friends in 1675.

The origins of the current book of discipline can be traced back to a manuscript in 1738 entitled Christian and brotherly advices given forth from time to time by the Yearly Meetings in London, alphabetically digested under proper heads. The first printed collection appeared in 1783 as Extracts from the minutes and advices of the Yearly Meeting of Friends held in London from its first institution (popularly known as the Book of Extracts). This was revised in 1801 and 1822 and 1833 (the last revision resulting in another change in title to Rules of Discipline). Up until this time, the publication was an alphabetical list of the main beliefs and practices of Quakers at the time.

From 1861 the Rules of Discipline was divided into separate chapters on

- Christian Doctrine – concerning the Christian theology and beliefs of Friends;
- Christian Practice – concerning the lives and testimonies of Friends
- Church Government – concerning the organisation, structure and government of the Religious Society of Friends, instead of the alphabetical arrangement of topics. This was revised in 1883, where it took the name Book of Christian discipline. Subsequently, the three chapters became three separate books, revised at various points over the next 50 years.

In 1921, a new publication Christian Life, Faith and Thought replaced the previous Christian Doctrine. This publication adopted a new approach of attempting "to state truth, not by formulating it, but by expressing it through the vital personal and corporate experience of Friends". Although much of this publication is in the form of prose drafted by a Revision Committee, this publication began the use of extracts which has subsequently been developed as an acceptable method of expressing the breadth of Quaker theology. In 1959 Christian Life, Faith and Thought and Christian Practice were revised, followed by a revision in 1967 of Church Government, and the three were merged into one new volume entitled Christian faith and practice in the experience of the Society of Friends. The 1959 edition of Christian Faith and Practice, whilst no longer used in Britain Yearly Meeting, is still a current book of discipline of Canadian Yearly Meeting. Church Government and Christian faith and practice together made up the Book of Discipline.

A new British revision was worked on from 1985, due to requests "not from the centre but from local meetings and individual Friends, as well as committees". to reflect developments in society, language and belief. The new version was accepted by Britain Yearly Meeting in 1994, and appeared in print in 1995, in one volume. This volume is almost entirely made up of an anthology of extracts from other sources, unlike earlier editions. This edition saw the name change to its current form – Quaker Faith and Practice: The book of Christian discipline of the Yearly Meeting of the Religious Society of Friends in Britain. The chapters on the structure and organisation of Britain Yearly Meeting have been revised several times since then to reflect organisational changes in Britain Yearly Meeting, and latterly to re-write the Chapter on 'Quaker marriage procedure' in connection with the Quaker approval of same-sex marriage. The rest of the book as currently exists has not been redrafted since 1994; however the process of doing so is currently beginning, as agreed by Britain Yearly Meeting in 2018.

Some Quakers in Britain have suggested that future editions revert to having two volumes to the Book of Discipline: Church Government dealing with organisation, structure and government of the Yearly Meeting; and Faith and Practice dealing with the beliefs, testimonies and practices of Quakers in Britain. The Fifth edition as revised through 2013 is available online.

=== United States ===
Various Yearly Meetings were founded in what is now the United States from the early days of Quakerism. Each of these produced their own book of discipline, although each was based on the earlier disciplines of London Yearly Meeting. These were revised at various points according to changes in beliefs and practices of Friends over time.

Conferences of Yearly Meetings in the later part of the nineteenth century, between the Guerneyite Yearly Meetings, who had accepted the Richmond Declaration of Faith, proposed formulating a Uniform Discipline for all the Guerneyite Yearly Meetings in the United States. In 1897, New England Yearly Meeting, Wilmington Yearly Meeting, Indiana Yearly Meeting, and Kansas Yearly Meeting jointly accepted The Constitution and Discipline for the American Yearly Meetings of Friends as their book of discipline, and this book was subsequently accepted as the book of discipline of California Yearly Meeting, New York Yearly Meeting, Western Yearly Meeting, and Baltimore Yearly Meeting in 1901; and of Oregon Yearly Meeting, North Carolina Yearly Meeting, and Iowa Yearly Meeting in 1902. When Nebraska Yearly Meeting was founded in 1908, they too accepted The Constitution and Discipline for the American Yearly Meetings of Friends as their book of discipline.

In 1940, Five Years Meeting proposed that the 1897 Uniform Discipline be updated and revised. The ensuing publication Faith and Practice, was published in three volumes: (I) Faith and Life; (II) Organisation and Business Procedure; (III) Authorised Declaration of Faith. However, controversies and disagreements between Yearly Meetings meant that not all Yearly Meetings accepted this book of discipline – some accepted only one or two volumes, and others made revisions or alterations to the text. The publication was never formally accepted by Five Years Meeting, although some Yearly Meetings did formally accept a revised version as their own book of discipline. Since then, each Yearly Meeting has revised their own books of discipline, and no longer use a Uniform Discipline.

==== Philadelphia Yearly Meeting ====
Philadelphia Yearly Meeting published their Rules of Discipline of the Yearly Meeting of Friends held in Philadelphia in 1806, with paragraphs on each of the main practices and testimonies of Friends in that Yearly Meeting arranged in alphabetical order. The title Faith and Practice was first applied to Philadelphia Yearly Meeting's book of discipline in 1955 and it was revised in 1972, 1979, and 1997, with minor revisions in 2002.

== Current books of discipline ==
There are currently over 30 different versions in print, each by a different yearly meeting, some also available to be viewed on-line. The names of the publications vary. Most Yearly Meetings either have:

- One volume called the Book of Discipline
- Two volumes, which together make up the Book of Discipline:
  - One called either Church Government or Handbook of Practice and Procedure – which deals with how the Yearly Meeting is organised and governed;
  - The other book called either Faith and Practice or Faith, Life and Thought or similar title – which deals with the main beliefs, doctrines and testimonies of the Quakers in that Yearly Meeting.

=== Australia ===
Australia Yearly Meeting publishes two separate books in the tradition of Quaker books of discipline. The Handbook of Practice and Procedure gives a brief history of the Society and detailed instructions on how the Society in Australia is run. This We Can Say: Quaker life, faith and thought, first published in 2003, was written over a period of ten years from 1993, to express personally the living faith of contemporary Australian Quakers. It also includes the Britain Yearly Meeting Advices and Queries.

=== Britain ===
The third edition of Quaker Faith and Practice

Britain Yearly Meeting's current book of discipline is called Quaker Faith and Practice: The book of Christian discipline of the Yearly Meeting of the Religious Society of Friends (Quakers) in Britain. The text of the first edition was originally approved by the Yearly Meeting of the Religious Society of Friends in Britain in 1994, and it has had four revisions since then, mainly because of changes in the structure of the Yearly Meeting. The fourth revision (giving rise to the 5th Edition, dated 2013) was in connection with the Quaker approval of same-sex marriage in the UK. It is often known simply as Quaker Faith and Practice, or sometimes the (Christian) 'Book of Discipline' but this has become less common. The current version, therefore, (in June 2014) is the fifth edition. It is available in paperback, hardback and large print, and is also free to view online. The book is only available from the Quaker Bookshop in Friends House, Euston, London, UK or from the online bookshop.

The first chapter, Advices and Queries, originated from queries asked by London Yearly Meeting (the predecessor to Britain Yearly Meeting) to the quarterly meetings about the state of their meetings, and advices originated from the original Christian and brotherly advices given forth from time to time by the Yearly Meetings in London, alphabetically digested under proper heads. Until 1994, there were separate General Advices and Queries, which tended to be related to each other – the advices giving advice on Christian living, and the queries being questions which asked Friends how they were living their lives, and could be used for personal reflection or discussion in groups. There was a requirement that all the advices and queries were read in each meeting over the course of a year. Since 1994, the advices and queries have been mixed together, so that each paragraph has both advices and queries within it. There is also no longer a requirement that they are read in each meeting, although some meetings do continue this practice. This chapter is published as a separate free booklet and is published in both English and Welsh.

=== Canada ===
The books of discipline of Canadian Yearly Meeting are made up of three publications:

- Canadian Yearly Meeting Organisation and Procedure (current edition published 2004) – which concerns the organisation, government and structure of Canadian Yearly Meeting, as well as chapters on membership, marriage procedures, etc.;
- In 2010 Canadian Yearly Meeting published its own book of discipline which has replaced the 1967 edition of Christian Faith and Practice in the Experience of the Society of Friends of London Yearly Meeting ("the blue book"), although it remains a useful reference. The new book is titled Faith and Practice of Canadian Yearly Meeting of the Religious Society of Friends.
- Advices and Queries – Canadian Yearly Meeting uses the same edition as Britain Yearly Meeting.

In 2000, Canadian Yearly Meeting appointed a Faith and Practice Development Committee to co-ordinate development of its own Faith and Practice, published in 2010.

=== Denmark ===
Råd og Spørgsmål (Advices and Queries) is the Advices and Queries of Denmark Yearly Meeting, being a Danish translation based on the 1994 Advices and Queries of Britain Yearly Meeting.

=== Central and Southern Africa ===
Central and Southern Africa Yearly Meeting's book of discipline is called The Handbook of Practice and Procedure, including chapters on structure, organisation and government of the Society of Friends and Quaker experience and concerns. It also includes Central and Southern Africa's Advices and Queries as its final chapter.

=== Germany and Austria ===
Quaker communities were established in 1677 and 1678 in what is now Germany at Emden and Friedrichstadt (extinct in 1727). English and American Friends organized a Quaker colony in Friedensthal (Peace Valley), which existed from 1792 until 1870 in what is now Bad Pyrmont, a city in the district of Hamelin-Pyrmont, in Lower Saxony (Niedersachsen), Germany. Land was donated for a meeting house in January 1791 and the Quaker Meeting House was built. In 1933, it was reconstructed and relocated from its original site to Bombergallee 9, Bad Pyrmont. The German Annual Meeting (Deutsche Jahresversammlung) was organized in 1880. The Germany Yearly Meeting (die Deutsche Jahresversammlung or DJV) resulted from the 1923 mergers of the German Annual Meeting with the Friends of Quakerism (Freunde des Quäkertums) and, in 1925, the Federation of German Friends (Bund der deutschen Freunde) and serves as an umbrella organization for the small liberal Quaker presence in Germany and Austria. This body uses a translation of Britain Yearly Meeting's current book of discipline Quaker Faith and Practice: The book of Christian discipline of the Yearly Meeting of the Religious Society of Friends (Quakers) in Britain entitled Quäker—Glaube und Wirken (das Handbuch der Quäker zur christlichen Lebensführung, übersetzt aus dem Englischen), 2010, 468 pp., price: €25.00 plus postage, ISBN 978-3-929696-44-8

=== New Zealand ===
In 2003, the Quakers of New Zealand published Quaker faith and practice in Aotearoa New Zealand, their first manual of Faith and Practice. The book is 22 cm and following three pages of prefatory materials, there are 177 pages of text. It is published by Yearly Meeting of the Religious Society of Friends (Quakers) of Aotearoa New Zealand, Auckland, New Zealand and distributed by Quaker Book Sales.

=== Switzerland ===
Friends from Switzerland Yearly Meeting published Swiss Quaker Life, Belief and Thought in 2009. It is an anthology of quotes on Swiss Quakers' lives, beliefs and thoughts, published tri-lingually in English, French and German. It differs from other Yearly Meetings' books of discipline in not containing chapters on the structure and organisation of Switzerland Yearly Meeting. The us et coutumes (in French) or Bräuche (in German) is presenting the organisation of the Society.

=== United States ===
Many of the different yearly meetings in the United States have their own books of discipline, most of which are titled Faith and Practice. Many of these are made available both in print and online.

Conservative Yearly Meetings	Meeting Formed	Title	Year of Adoption
Iowa Yearly Meeting (Conservative)	1863	Faith and Practice	1974, July 2012
North Carolina Yearly Meeting (Conservative)		Discipline	1869 (revisions in 1876, 1908, 1950, 1969, and 1979) 1983, Material That Has Received First Approval
Ohio Yearly Meeting		Book of Discipline	2001 2001 as pdf, 33 pp., 2013 Discipline (57 pdfs)
Evangelical Friends Church, International	Meeting Formed	Title	Year of Adoption
Alaska Yearly Meeting	1970	Handbook of Faith, Practice & Discipline	Revised in 1987 and adopted in 1988
Evangelical Friends Church – Eastern Region	1812	Faith and Practice	2012 Faith and Practice, 2013 F&P and Discipline (116 pdfs)
Evangelical Friends Church, Mid-America Yearly Meeting	1836	Faith and Practice	Faith and Practice: The Book of Discipline (Link to all five parts in pdf format.)
Evangelical Friends Church Southwest		Faith and Practice	2001, 2011 Faith and Practice
Northwest Yearly Meeting		Faith and Practice	2008, July 2011, July 2012 F&P (93 pdfs)
Rocky Mountain Yearly Meeting	1957	Faith and Practice	1997 On-line 2007 copyright ''Faith and Practice''
Friends General Conference Yearly Meetings	Meeting Formed	Title	Year of Adoption
Alaska Friends Conference	1957		Alaska Friends Conference Faith and Practice (Draft)
Illinois Yearly Meeting	1875	Faith and Practice	1878, 1892, 1927, 1942, 1955 Philadelphia F&P adopted in 1957. In process of writing own F&P.
Intermountain Yearly Meeting	1974	Faith and Practice	Link to downloadable PDF of the 2009 edition. (First edition exclusively for use of the Intermountain YM). Used North Pacific materials prior to this.
Lake Erie Yearly Meeting	1962 or 1963	Policies and Procedures Booklet	1995 Policies & Procedures Manual (2011 revision, last edited 4/23/14, 42 pdfs)
Ohio Valley Yearly Meeting	c. 1830	Faith and Practice	1978 edition revised through 2014 Onio Valley (1978 ed., rev. through 2014, 53 pdfs) June 30, 2018 Revision Committee Edition
Philadelphia Yearly Meeting		Faith and Practice	1955 revised in 1972, 1997, 2002, 2017
Piedmont Friends Yearly Meeting formerly Piedmont Friends Fellowship	2014	Faith and Practice	
South Central Yearly Meeting	1961	Faith and Practice	As of 2012, in process of formulating.
Southern Appalachian Yearly Meeting and Association	1979	A Guide to Our Faith and Practice	Faith and Practice 2012 (Third edition)
Friends General Conference and Friends United Meeting Yearly Meetings	Meeting Formed	Title	Year of Adoption
Baltimore Yearly Meeting	1672 meetings reunited 1968	Faith and Practice	1988 (revised 2001), 2012 draft (also downloadable as a pdf). 2013 Draft Faith and Practice of Baltimore Yearly Meeting See note.
New England Yearly Meeting	1661 (oldest YM in the world)	Faith and Practice	1966, 1986 (currently being revised), NEYM Interim Faith and Practice 2014, Download and update webpage on NEYM.org
New York Yearly Meeting		Faith and Practice	1998 revised in 2001
Northern Yearly Meeting	1975	Faith and Practice	2017 Drafts and Approved Chapters
Southeastern Yearly Meeting	April 1962	Faith and Practice	2001 (undergoing revision) SEYM Faith and Practice website
Friends United Meeting Yearly Meetings	Meeting Formed	Title	Year of Adoption
Great Plains Yearly Meeting		Faith and Practice	
Indiana Yearly Meeting		Faith and Practice	2007, 2011, 2015, 2018 Proposed revision with changes noted
Iowa Yearly Meeting	1860	Discipline	1974, 2009, 2014 revision in .pdf
North Carolina Yearly Meeting (FUM)	1698	Faith and Practice	1947, 1956, 1962, 1967, 1970, 2004, 2012
Western Association of the Religious Society of Friends (WARSF), Whittier, California	1996	Faith and Practice	
Western Yearly Meeting	1996	Faith and Practice	2005
Wilmington Yearly Meeting		Faith and Practice	1977 revised in 2000, 1977 ed. (2008 ed.) link to pdfs of each section
Holiness Yearly Meeting	Meeting Formed	Title	Year of Adoption
Central Yearly Meeting	1926	Manual of Faith and Practice	2018
Independent Yearly Meetings	Meeting Formed	Title	Year of Adoption
Missouri Valley Friends Conference			
North Pacific Yearly Meeting	1972	Faith and Practice	1993 (Second ed.) Faith and Practice (undergoing revision) July 2014 Transitional Edition (111 pdfs) 2017 ed. Faith & Practice (303 pdfs)
Pacific Yearly Meeting	1947	Faith and Practice	1952, 1957, 1963, 1973, 1985, 2001 (revision of the 1985 edition) Revision of the 2001 F&P started in 2014 and is ongoing.
Individual Meetings	Meeting Formed	Title	Year of Adoption
Cliftondale Friends Christian Church (Ulster County, New York)	1801	Book of Discipline Containing the Faith and Practice	1996 with revisions through 2006
Fairhope, Alabama Friends Meeting (an independent Conservative meeting)	1970	Discipline of Fairhope (Alabama) Friends Meeting 1970.	1970 Discipline of Fairhope (Alabama) Friends Meeting (18 pdfs)
Freedom Friends (Salem, Oregon)		Faith and Practice	Feb. 2009
Friends Meeting of Washington, DC	before 2013	Handbook of Practices and Procedures	2013 Handbook

== See also ==
- Meeting for Sufferings
- Query (Quaker)
- Recorded Minister
- The Testimonies of the Religious Society of Friends
