= Quakers in Africa =

There are about 180,000 members of the Religious Society of Friends, or Quakers, in Africa. African Friends make up around 49% of Friends internationally, the largest proportion on any one continent. Kenya has the largest number of Quakers in a single nation—about 119,000 in the year 2017 (according to the Friends World Committee for Consultation). The three main denominations of Friends, Friends United Meeting, Friends General Conference, and Evangelical Friends Church International, all have affiliated Yearly Meetings (associations) in Africa. There are also independent meetings in several African nations.

== South Africa & Central and Southern Africa Yearly Meeting ==
Central and Southern African Yearly Meeting was founded by Friends from London Yearly Meeting. A meeting was first established in Cape Town in 1728. Friends worshiping in South Africa separated from the London Yearly Meeting to become an independent Yearly Meeting in 1948. Due to the historic links with London Yearly Meeting, worship is in the unprogrammed tradition, in contrast with Friends' meetings in East Africa.

== Kenya ==
=== History ===
On April 23, 1902 three Friends—Arthur Chilson, Edgar Hole, and Willis Hotchkiss—set sail from New York to Mombasa, Kenya. They went on behalf of the Cleveland Friends Meeting. From there they made their way across by rail to Kisumu and then by foot to Kaimosi and set up a mission there on August 17. They came from the programmed tradition of Five Years Meeting (now Friends United Meeting).

From that small beginning, Quakerism grew and spread throughout Kenya during the twentieth century, although it is still concentrated in the western area. A mission hospital (Kaimosi Hospital) was founded in 1941. The Friends Bible Institute opened in 1942. Friends gradually spread into other areas of Kenya, with another hospital (in Lugulu), an epilepsy colony, an agricultural college and a college of technology all being established, as well as many new churches. It also spread to the neighboring countries of Uganda and Tanganyika (modern Tanzania). Due to the size, the original East Africa Yearly Meeting split into several smaller Yearly Meetings.

=== Organization ===
There is now one umbrella organization, Friends Church in Kenya (FCK), which brings together all fourteen Yearly Meetings in Kenya.

Yearly meetings in Kenya are part of the Friends United Meeting. They include:

- Bware Yearly Meeting, based in Suna in southern Nyanza Province.
- Central Yearly Meeting, based in Lirhanda, just east of Kakamega.
- Chavakali Yearly Meeting, based in Chavakali, just behind the Boys Secondary School.
- Chwele Yearly Meeting, based in Chwele, on the southern slopes of Mt Elgon.
- Chevaywa Yearly Meeting, based in Malava, Matete area.
- East Africa Yearly Meeting (Kaimosi), based in Tiriki on the Kaimosi mission compound.
- East Africa Yearly Meeting (North), based in Kitale town.
- Elgon East Yearly Meeting, based in Kitale town.
- Elgon Religious Society of Friends, based in Lugulu, just north of Webuye on the Kitale road.
- Kakamega Yearly Meeting, based in Kakamega at the Amalemba Friends Center.
- Lugari Yearly Meeting, based in Turbo.
- Malava Yearly Meeting, based in Malava, just west of the market center.
- Musingu Yearly Meeting based in Kakamega.
- Nairobi Yearly Meeting, based at the Friends International Center, Ngong Rd, Nairobi.
- Tuloi Yearly Meeting, based in Kapsabet.
- Vihiga Yearly Meeting, based in Vihiga, just west of Majengo.
- Vokoli Yearly Meeting, based in Wodanga, behind the Moi Girls High School.
- Soy Yearly Meeting, based in Soy.

== Uganda ==
The Friends Church spread to Uganda from Kenyan Friends, under the auspices of East Africa Yearly Meeting. By 1945, there were Friends Churches in Sibuse, Nabiswa, Kigumba, Nang'oma and Kampala. However, the Friends Church was banned by Idi Amin in 1973, until the end of his leadership of Uganda in 1979. After this, an independent Uganda Yearly Meeting was formed, separate from East Africa Yearly Meeting.

There is also a second Yearly Meeting in Uganda, Evangelical Friends Church - Uganda. They have applied for affiliation with Evangelical Friends International.

== Tanzania ==
The first Quakers moved to Tanzania from Kenya to look for land, which they found on the border of the Serengeti Game Reserve. Subsequent missionary activity from East Africa Yearly Meeting increased membership, with service projects aimed at agricultural training—popularly known as the "Lord's acre plan". Due to political pressures, many Kenyans left Tanzania in 1978, with Tanzania Yearly Meeting of Friends being founded as a separate organisation in 1980.

Kyela Monthly Meeting of Friends (Southern Tanzania) was founded as a worship group when a local man (Barnabas Mwaihojo) read about Quakers on the internet, which led to him setting up meetings in three local villages. These have now grown in number, with nine meetings in the southern region of Tanzania. Quakers now have the following meetings in the south: Kyela Friends Church, Muaya, Mbeya, Tunduma, Sumbawanga, Iringa and many others coming up. Daresalaam Friends church has grown well and strong in the city of Daresalaam. Mwanza town has three Friends Meetings. Roria Friends churches along the lake region have also been growing strongly. The Yearly Meeting headquarters is based in Mugumu Serengeti region of Tanzania.

== Burundi ==
One of the original missionaries from the US who first planted the Friends Church in Kenya, Arthur Chilson, and his wife Edna, left Kenya to found the Evangelical Friends Church in Burundi in 1934, which was to be run on more evangelical theology, in line with Evangelical Friends International. All foreign missionaries to Burundi were expelled in 1980, and Eglise Evangelique des Amis du Burundi (Evangelical Friends Church Burundi) now exists as an independent Yearly Meeting run by Burundians, affiliated to Evangelical Friends International.

Burundi has the second largest population of Friends in Africa with around 47,600 members.

== Rwanda ==
Eglise Evangelique des Amis au Rwanda was founded by three missionaries, George Morris, Willard Ferguson and Doris Ferguson, who had been serving in Burundi. Unusually for the Society of Friends, the Friends Church in Rwanda practices water baptism.

Rwanda is home to approximately 6,000 Friends as of 2017.

== Democratic Republic of Congo ==
There are two groups of Friends worshipping in the Democratic Republic of Congo. The Communaute des Eglise Evangelique au Congo (Community of Evangelical Church of Congo) are evangelical, programmed Friends affiliated to Evangelical Friends International, formed from missionaries from Burundi in 1981. They still remain a part of Evangelical Friends Church Burundi rather than being a separate Yearly Meeting.

A completely separate, and much smaller, unprogrammed meeting exists in Kinshasa, with a membership of about 50.

In total, the DRC had 4,220 Friends as of 2017.

== Ghana ==
Since 1925, there has been one unprogrammed Friends' meeting, Hill House Meeting, in the tradition of London Yearly Meeting, attached to Achimota School and college.

== Nigeria ==
There is a small unprogrammed meeting in Lagos, founded in 1995, and two other small meetings total 20 Nigerian Friends.

== Congo ==
There is a small unprogrammed worship group in Brazzaville with 10 members as of 2017.
