= World Gathering of Young Friends =

Gatherings of Religious Society of Friends members

The World Gathering of Young Friends is the name of several gatherings of members of the Religious Society of Friends between the ages of 18 and 35. There have been two gatherings by this name; the first in 1985 in Greensboro, North Carolina, United States, and the second in 2005 in Lancaster, England, and Mombasa, Kenya. Though these gatherings are the first that were truly worldwide in scope, they followed many gatherings of a similar sort of Friends from North America and Europe.

== 1985 ==
The WGYF was held in 1985 in Greensboro, North Carolina, on the campus of Guilford College.

Seen as a defining moment for the Religious Society of Friends worldwide, this gathering is generally considered to be the beginning of the thawing of many of the strained relationships which exist amongst divided theologies of Quakers around the world. Many participants and organisers went on to take up key roles of leadership in their respective Yearly Meetings. The epistle from the 1985 WGYF and the report of the process of its creation get cited in many Quaker contexts and it makes inspiring reading, whatever one's background may be.

== 2005 ==
World Gathering of Young Friends 16–24 August 2005

The aim of the World Gathering of Young Friends 2005 was to bring together, at Lancaster University, Friends aged 18–35 from around the world to build community within the next generation of Quaker leaders. They studied and learned from their heritage, shared their present-day expressions of faith, and tried to discern how Christ is guiding them to facilitate understanding within the Quaker family. By sharing experiences of living Quaker testimony from their varied cultures, they sought to ask humbly for guidance and to open themselves to the possibility of transformation. Unfortunately, the British government refused even temporary visas to many attendees from India and Africa. Therefore, a second conference was held in Kanamai, Mombasa, Kenya from 20 to 24 October 2005.

== Epistles ==
- Epistle from the WGYF in Greensboro, North Carolina, US, in 1985
- Epistle from the WGYF in Lancaster, UK, in 2005
- Epistle from the WGYF in Mombasa, Kenya, in 2005
