= Te Hāhi Tūhauwiri =

The Yearly Meeting of Aotearoa/New Zealand (Te Hāhi Tūhauwiri) is the umbrella body and Yearly Meeting of the Religious Society of Friends in New Zealand.

== History ==
The Quaker Yearly Meeting of New Zealand underwent significant transformations between 1840 and 1920, a period marked by the Society of Friends' adaptation and growth in a new geographical and cultural context. The New Zealand Society, starting with just 26 members in 1853, expanded to approximately 430 by 1920. This growth is noteworthy given the Quakers' focus on spiritual depth rather than numerical strength or extensive organizational frameworks.

The origins of Quakerism are attributed to George Fox, whose mystical experiences led to a belief in direct communion with God's spirit. Initially lacking formal doctrines or membership, Fox's teachings attracted those dissatisfied with the existing religious institutions, forming the foundation of the Quaker faith. In England, despite a decline from their 18th-century numbers due to factors like emigration and disciplinary practices, the Quakers developed a complex organizational system. The London Yearly Meeting, serving as the governing body of Quakerism, played a crucial role in managing international affairs, including those in New Zealand. The relationship between New Zealand Friends and the London Yearly Meeting, particularly through the Meeting for Sufferings and the Continental Committee (later the Australasian Committee), was pivotal in the development and support of the New Zealand community.

The Quaker structure in New Zealand evolved over time, reflecting its English roots. Key developments included the establishment of Monthly and Quarterly Meetings from 1885, serving as local governance bodies with various administrative and spiritual responsibilities. These meetings gradually took on roles similar to those of a Yearly Meeting, a status formally recognized for New Zealand in 1964. The Quaker population growth in New Zealand was largely driven by English immigrants, who adapted to the challenging and isolated conditions of their new environment. This period also saw the preservation and adaptation of unique Quaker practices, such as a worship style devoid of a paid ministry and a focus on the 'inner light' within each individual, guiding their spiritual journey.

== Current status ==
Monthly meetings under the care of the Yearly Meeting in New Zealand include Northern, Mid-North Island, Palmerston North, Whanganui, Wellington, Christchurch, and Dunedin. In the 2018 Census, 954 people stated their religion as "Religious Society of Friends (Quaker)".
