= Mid-India Yearly Meeting =

- Classification: Quaker
- Associations: Friends World Committee for Consultation
- Region: Madhya Pradesh, India
- Origin: Hoshangabad, India
- Branched from: London Yearly Meeting
- Congregations: 6
- Primary schools: 4

Mid-India Yearly Meeting is a yearly meeting of the Religious Society of Friends in Madhya Pradesh state in mid-India. Quakerism came to mid-India as a result of missionaries from London Yearly Meeting who were members of the Friends Foreign Mission Association. Missions were established in Mid-India in 1866 (159 years ago) by the Friends Foreign Mission Association. Mid-India Yearly Meeting was founded as an independent yearly meeting in 1907 (118 years ago) in Hoshangabad.

There are six monthly meetings in Mid-India Yearly Meeting: Hoshangabad Friends Meeting, Itarsi Friends Meeting, Kheda Friends Meeting (also in Itarsi), Sohagpur Friends Meeting, Seoni Malwa Friends Meeting and Makoriya Friends Meeting. There are three schools in Itarsi which were founded and still run by Friends, but which now belong to the Indian government. There is also the Sohugpur Friends' Girls' School which was founded by Friends and continues to be run by Mid-India Yearly Meeting Friends.

In 2002, Mid-India Yearly Meeting published a Hindi language version of Britain Yearly Meeting's Advices and Queries, the part of British Quaker Faith and Practice.

It is affiliated to Friends World Committee for Consultation.
