= IYM =

IYM may refer to:

- India Yamaha Motor
- A number of different Quaker Yearly Meetings:
  - Indiana Yearly Meeting
  - Iowa Yearly Meeting
  - Ireland Yearly Meeting
- International Year of Mountains, an international observance
