= Query (Quaker) =

Quakers use the term Query to refer to a question or series of questions used for reflection and in spiritual exercises.

Friends have used Queries as tools for offering spiritual challenges to the community for much of their history. Queries often take the form of a collection of themed questions that are read at the beginning of a time of worship or reflection.

Many yearly meetings maintain a set of basic queries in their books of Faith and Practice to provide guidance on certain issues over time. Individuals often offer queries from time to time to provide a spiritual challenge to their local community of Friends.
