= Quakers in Latin America =

Latin America contains approximately 14% of the world's Quakers. Latin American Friends are concentrated in Bolivia and Central America. Most of these Friends are evangelical and are affiliated with Evangelical Friends Church International. Friends World Committee for Consultation organizes among them through the Comité de Amigos Latinoamericanos CoAL del Comité Mundial de Consulta de Los Amigos CMCA FWCC.

== Bolivia and South America ==
There are about 30,000 Friends in Bolivia. Quakerism came to Bolivia in 1919 through a Navajo man, William Abel, who sold Bibles and preached in the capital city of La Paz. Bolivian Juan Ayllón became convinced of the truth of the preacher's message and went to study at the Friends' Biblical Institute in Guatemala. After graduating in 1924 he returned and began the Evangelical Friends Church. This yearly meeting, now INELA-BOLIVIA, Iglesia Nacional Evangélica de Los Amigos, consists of 192 congregations throughout Bolivia and sponsors several schools.

Also during 1919 the Holiness Friends Mission, an association of independent Indiana Friends, established meetings in Bolivia's northern Andes surrounding Sorata village. When the mission reorganized as Central Friends Mission in 1952 the Bolivian meetings divided into two Yearly Meetings—Junta Anual de Amigos Central (Bolivian Friends YM), and Holiness Friends (Junta Anual de Misión Santidad de Los Amigos de Bolivia). At first, Bolivian Yearly Meetings consisted only of members of Aymara heritage. Aymara Friends are now working among Quechua, Moseten, Chimane, and other indigenous groups. Yearly Meetings include Iglesia Evangélica Amigos Central (semi-programmed congregations in the Friends Church related to Central YM), Iglesia Evangélica Unión Boliviana "Amigos" (Bolivian Union Evangelical Friends Church), Iglesia Nacional Evangélica Los Amigos de Bolivia (National Evangelical Friends Church of Bolivia) or INELA-Bolivia, and Iglesia Evangélica Misión Boliviana de Santidad Amigos (Bolivian Evangelical Mission of Holiness Friends Church).

In Peru there are about 1,200 Friends; they are a part of INELA-Perú Iglesia Nacional Evangélica Los Amigos del Perú (National Evangelical Friends Church of Peru), an outgrowth of INELA-Bolivia. This church has grown through extensive youth outreach. Bolivian Friends are also supporting missions in northwest Argentina, especially among indigenous people there.

Two other small Friends groups exist in Bolivia: Iglesia Nacional Evangélica 'Estrella de Belén', Iglesia Nacional Evangélica 'Seminario Bíblico' are beginning to cooperate with the other Yearly Meetings.

== Central America and Cuba ==
There are approximately 19,800 Friends in the nation of Guatemala. Missions from California and Oregon YM early in the 20th century led to the founding of Central America Yearly Meeting, with headquarters at Chiquimula. Due to the closing of borders because of war conditions, and because of theological distinctions, the Chiquimula Yearly Meeting formed daughter Yearly Meetings: Iglesia Nacional 'Los Amigos' de Guatemala (National Evangelical Friends Church of Guatemala), the official successor, Iglesia Evangélica Embajadores Amigos (Friends Ambassadors Evangelical Church) (a Monthly Meeting with several preparative meetings that functions as a Yearly Meeting), and Junta Anual Amigos de Santidad (Holiness Friends Yearly Meeting). There is also Guatemala Monthly Meeting, a small unprogrammed meeting affiliated with Pacific Yearly Meeting (meetings alternating between Guatemala capital and Guatemala Antigua), which operates PROGRESA (formerly Guatemala Friends Scholarship Program), an educational program at the high school and university level serving primarily highlands indigenous communities. (This last was laid down in 2018.)

Honduras Yearly Meeting of the Friends Church was formed from the eastern missions of CA YM. In the 1950s an agreement among North American missionaries abandoned Tegucigalpa and nearby meetings and Junta Anual Evangélica Amigos de Honduras is concentrated around San Pedro Sula, Santa Rosa de Copán and San Marcos Ocotepeque, where there is a school/seminary. Tegucigalpa Friends Church has returned to the YM.

In El Salvador there are about 550 Friends, members of Junta Anual de la Iglesia Evangélica de Los Amigos en El Salvador (Friends Evangelical Church YM in El Salvador). They have a number of congregations and YM offices in Soyopango, a suburb of San Salvador. Recently the YM has taken on the project of promoting "Proyecto Alternativas a la Violencia" PAV (AVP - the Alternatives to Violence Project)

There are also about 90 Quakers in Costa Rica, divided between 3 meetings. Monteverde Monthly Meeting was founded as a colony by a group of young Conservative Friends families in 1952, trying to find a place that was not militaristic. Many of the men in the group had been incarcerated in the United States as conscientious objectors and they were attracted when Costa Rica abolished its army. El Centro de Los Amigos para la Paz, with a small hostel, was founded as a community center and a home for San José Quakers' unprogrammed silent worship in the 1980s.

Mexico has about 1,250 Friends in three Yearly Meetings—the Asociación Religiosa de las Iglesias Evangélicas de los Amigos (the yearly meeting of the Religious Association of the Friends Evangelical Churches EFCI) and the Reunion General de los Amigos en México (General Meeting of Friends in Mexico), comprising several churches around Ciudad Victoria monthly meeting (founded by missions from FUM), and Mexico City Monthly Meeting, affiliated with Pacific Yearly Meeting, an open worship, liberal meeting in the Mexican capital. They manage the Casa de Los Amigos in Mexico DF, which has numerous programs, including refugee support. There are similar groups in Sonora as well. A new evangelical mission is forming as Junta Anual de la Iglesia Evangélica de Los Amigos in the Valle de México.

There are about 900 Friends in Cuba. They are members of Cuba Yearly Meeting ("Junta Anual de la Iglesia de Los Amigos (Cuáqueros) en Cuba"), which is affiliated with Friends United Meeting. The first MMs in Banes and Gibara were begun in 1904. All but one of the 11 monthly meetings are in former Oriente province, around Holguín. Also in Cuba there was a small unprogrammed group in Havana starting in 1994, which spread silent worship across the Island; there were unprogrammed groups in Holguin for two years, one in Santiago de Cuba and in Santi Spiritus for a while, but all have been laid down. Looking at their missionary heritage and developing their Quaker roots while seeking to develop a Cuban Quakerism in the rapidly changing national environment, the YM founded the Cuban Quaker Peace Institute, "Instituto Cuáquero Cubano de Paz" in Gibara in 2013, with courses promoting the Quaker Testimonies and peace-building.

After the Conference of Friends in the Americas in 1977, Latino Friends got to know each other and FWCC began an effort to help them organize. This led to the founding of CoAL in Mexico City in 1982. EFCI also began trying to bring all the Evangelical mission church YMs of the region into a region of their denomination, as well as other programmed Quakers. Today pastoral and Evangelical Friends in Latin America are in regular contact, but they are only slowly constructing links to one another.

There have been unprogrammed worship meetings and groups in Latin America for several years, the oldest and most permanent in Costa Rica and Mexico; the majority of the others are expatriates' worship groups plus around 10 in Colombia's Bogotá Monthly Meeting. Unprogrammed Friends in Latin America had their first meeting in November 2006 in Monteverde, Costa Rica.
