= Bundelkhand Yearly Meeting =

- Classification: Quaker
- Associations: Friends World Committee for Consultation; Evangelical Friends International
- Region: Bundelkhand, Madhya Pradesh, India
- Origin: 1956; Chhatarpur
- Branched from: Ohio Yearly Meeting
- Congregations: 5
- Hospitals: 1
- Primary schools: 4

Bundelkhand Yearly Meeting (Bundelkhand Masihi Mitr Samaj) is a yearly meeting of the Religious Society of Friends in the Bundelkhand region of Madhya Pradesh state in mid-India. It was formed from Friends Churches set up by missionaries from Ohio Yearly Meeting in 1896, and the first independent yearly meeting was held in Chhatarpur in 1956. Theologically it falls within the evangelical tradition, unlike nearby Mid-India Yearly Meeting.

The main Friends' Church is at Chhatarpur, where the church is adjacent to Chhatarpur Christian Hospital, which was set up by Friends from the Friends' Foreign Mission Society in 1930, and run by Friends although is now administered as part of Emmanuel Hospital Association. There is also an English-medium and Hindi-medium Christian school run by the Friends' Church. There are also Friends' Churches at Nowgong, Bijawar and Ghuwara.

It is affiliated to Evangelical Friends Church International and Friends World Committee for Consultation.
