= Quaker Life =

Quaker Life is a central department of the Yearly Meeting of the Religious Society of Friends (Quakers) in Britain, the national organisation of Quakers in England, Wales, Scotland, the Isle of Man and the Channel Islands. Its work is to develop the spiritual life of Quakers in Britain, and the running of Quaker Meetings within Britain.

== Work ==
Its work is divided into six main areas:

- faith and practice
- diversity and inclusion
- children and young people
- meeting house staff
- outreach
- pastoral care

This department complements the work of Quaker Peace and Social Witness: Quaker Life mainly being an inward-looking department mainly working for members of the Yearly Meeting; whilst Quaker Peace and Social Witness is an outward-looking department, mainly working for peace and social action outside of the Yearly Meeting membership.

There is a permanent secretariat who works in the central offices of Britain Yearly Meeting at Friends House in London. Their work is governed by the Quaker Life Central Committee, which is a central committee of Britain Yearly Meeting. Ultimately, their work is governed by Britain Yearly Meeting, which meets once a year, and in between sittings of Britain Yearly Meeting, by Meeting for Sufferings.

== History ==
Friends' Home Mission Committee was set up by London Yearly Meeting in 1882, to promote the growth of home mission work in the Yearly Meeting. It was decided in 1893 that this committee should be appointed by representatives serving each of the Quarterly Meetings, each of whom would serve for three years. The work of this committee widened, and the committee's name was therefore changed to Friends' Home Mission and Extension Committee (in 1906) and then Friends Home Service Committee (in 1927). There was a reorganisation of all the central standing committees of London Yearly Meeting in 1981, and this resulted in a change of name again, to Quaker Home Service. The function of Quaker Home Service was to support and strengthen the life of local meetings, the individuals within them and the yearly meeting as a whole. In 1998, there was a further reorganisation of the central committees of Britain Yearly Meeting, with most of the work of Quaker Home Service being taken on by a new central committee called Quaker Life.
