= Canadian Yearly Meeting =

Body of the Religious Society of Friends

- Classification: Quaker
- Associations: Friends General Conference, Friends United Meeting, Friends World Committee for Consultation
- Region: Canada
- Origin: 1955
- Merger of: Genesee Yearly Meeting, Canada Yearly Meeting (Five Years Meeting), Canada Yearly Meeting (Conservative)
- Members: 1300
- Official website: www.quaker.ca

Canadian Yearly Meeting (CYM) is a body of the Religious Society of Friends (Quakers), with approximately 1300 members in Canada and border areas of the United States. Its offices are located in Ottawa. It was formed in 1955 by the amalgamation of three groups from different branches of Quakerism: Genesee Yearly Meeting (Friends General Conference), Canada Yearly Meeting (Five Years Meeting) and Canada Yearly Meeting (Conservative).

Canadian Yearly Meeting (CYM) consists of 27 Monthly Meetings (MMs), in five regional groupings:

- Western Half Yearly Meeting: Prairie MM, Winnipeg MM, Saskatoon MM, Calgary MM, Edmonton MM, Argenta MM, Vernon MM, Vancouver MM, Vancouver Island MM, Saanich Peninsula MM.
- Pelham Half Yearly Meeting: Kitchener Area MM, Coldstream MM, Yarmouth MM, Pelham Executive Meeting.
- Yonge St. Half Yearly Meeting: Toronto Monthly Meeting, Hamilton MM, Yonge St. MM.
- St. Lawrence Regional Gathering: Ottawa MM, Wooler MM, Thousand Islands MM, Montreal MM, Peterborough MM.
- Atlantic Friends Gathering: New Brunswick MM, Annapolis Valley MM, Halifax MM.

The annual Yearly Meeting Sessions are held in the summer, rotating between sites in western, central and eastern Canada.

CYM carries out work through various committees, including the Canadian Friends Service Committee (CFSC), the Canadian Friends Foreign Missionary Board, the Home Mission and Advancement Committee (including the Quaker Book Service), and Camp NeeKauNis Committee.
