= Philadelphia Yearly Meeting =

Organizing body for Quaker meetings in Pennsylvania

Coordinates: 39.95575°N 75.16498°W

- Classification: Protestant
- Theology: Quaker
- Distinct fellowships: Friends General Conference
- Associations: National Council of Churches, Friends World Committee for Consultation
- Region: Mid-Atlantic USA
- Official website: https://www.pym.org/

The Philadelphia Yearly Meeting of the Religious Society of Friends, or simply the Philadelphia Yearly Meeting, or PYM, is the central organizing body for Quaker meetings in the Philadelphia, Pennsylvania, United States area, including parts of Pennsylvania, Maryland, Delaware and New Jersey. The PYM is primarily affiliated with the Friends General Conference and is a member of the National Council of Churches.

== History ==
Philadelphia Yearly Meeting is one of the oldest Yearly Meetings in the Religious Society of Friends. It traces its origins to 1682 when a monthly meeting of Friends in Philadelphia was established at the now-demolished Bank Street Meeting House. By 1707, it had published its own "book of discipline", the standards and practices by which Friends worship, conduct business, and relate to one another and to the world.

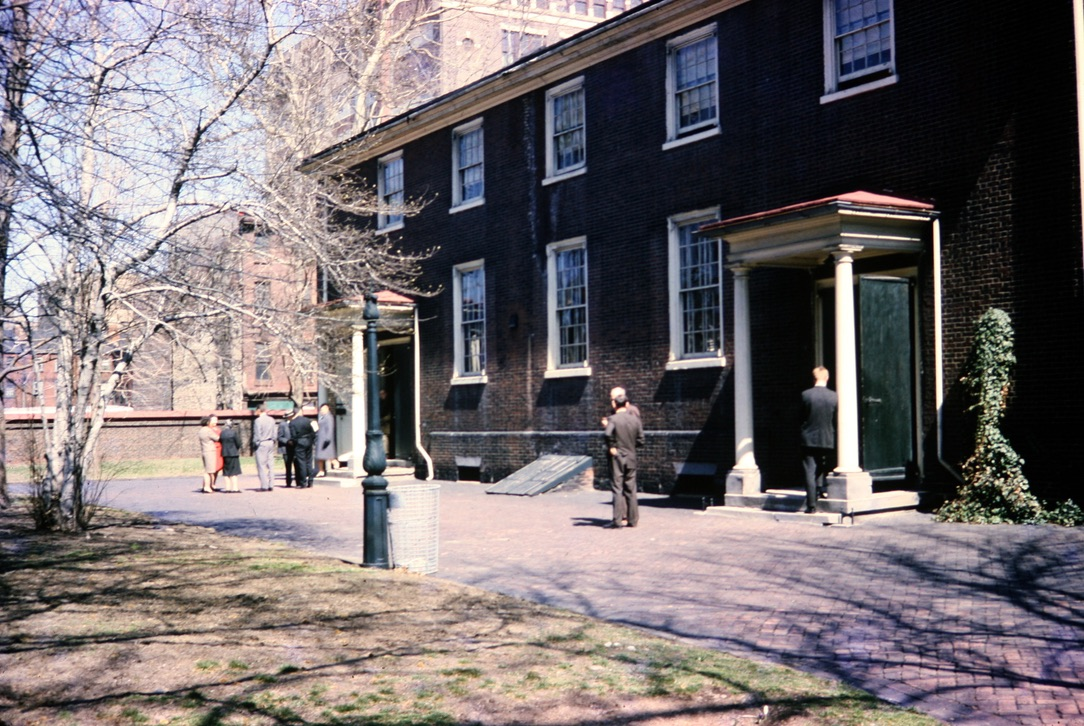
Arch Street Meeting House circa 1970, formerly the site of the Philadelphia Yearly Meeting (Orthodox) 15 years after the two Philadelphia Yearly Meetings reunited

In 1827, it divided into two meetings in the Hicksite/Orthodox schism, each claiming the title of Philadelphia Yearly Meeting. During this period, the two meetings were known by the location of their respective meetinghouses (Race Street for the Hicksite Friends and Arch Street for the Orthodox Friends).

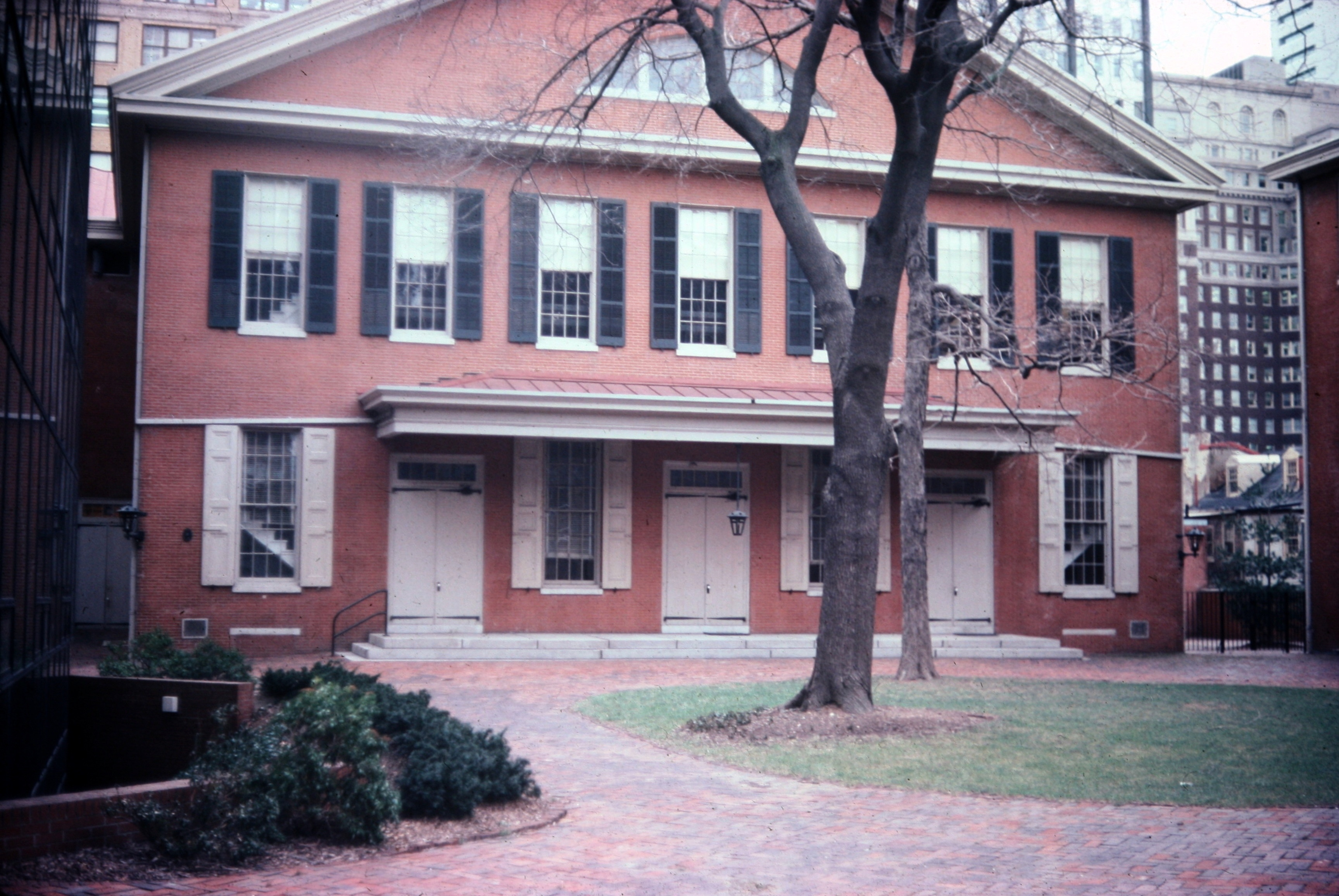
Race Street Friends Meeting House in 2018, formerly the site of the Philadelphia Yearly Meeting (Hicksite), 63 years after the two Philadelphia Yearly Meetings reunited

In 1955, the schism was healed and the two meetings were reunited. The Yearly Meeting is a member of Friends General Conference, the main national organization of unprogrammed Quaker Meetings. The Yearly Meeting is also a member of the National Council of Churches.

== Organization ==
The yearly meeting’s more than 100 monthly meetings in the four-state area (Delaware, Maryland, New Jersey, and Pennsylvania) associate with one another in regional groups meeting for worship and business every three months. These groupings are known as quarterly meetings.

The quarters within the Philadelphia Yearly Meeting are:

- Abington (Abington Township, Montgomery County, Pennsylvania). This meeting has its own website.
- Bucks (Newtown, Bucks County, Pennsylvania) This meeting has its own website.
- Burlington (Burlington, Burlington County, New Jersey) This meeting collaborates with other New Jersey quarters on the South Jersey Quakers website.
- Caln (Caln Township, Chester County, Pennsylvania)
- Chester (Chester, Delaware County, Pennsylvania)
- Concord (Concordville, Delaware County, Pennsylvania) This meeting has its own website.
- Haddonfield (Haddonfield, Camden County, New Jersey) This meeting collaborates with other New Jersey quarters on the South Jersey Quakers website.
- Haverford (Haverford, Delaware County, Pennsylvania)
- Philadelphia (Philadelphia City and County, Pennsylvania) This meeting has its own website.
- Salem (Salem, Salem County, New Jersey) This meeting has its own website and collaborates with other New Jersey quarters on the South Jersey Quakers website.
- Southern (Easton, Talbot County, Maryland)
- Upper Susquehanna (Millville, Columbia County, Pennsylvania) This meeting has its own website.
- Western (Kennett Square, Chester County, Pennsylvania) This meeting has its own website.

The administrative offices of Philadelphia Yearly Meeting are at 1501 Cherry Street in Philadelphia. The Yearly Meeting is one of the principal tenants of Friends Center, a LEED-certified building in the central part of Philadelphia.

Since 2020, Friends throughout the Yearly Meeting have incorporated the use of hybrid technology into meetings for worship and business. Most Friends have personal access to or can obtain access to a connected device, allowing wider participation in the Yearly Meeting's spiritual, social, governance, and affinity communities throughout the four states and beyond.

== Governance ==
The governance of Philadelphia Yearly Meeting occurs through its three councils. The Administrative Council addresses matters of business, finance, and personnel. It serves as the Yearly Meeting's board of trustees with the same fiduciary responsibilities as those of the boards of other non-profit organizations. The Quaker Life Council addresses matters of spirituality, Quaker faith, and Quaker practice in the world. Its members serve as a board of elders for the Yearly Meeting. The Nominating Council seeks and names members of the Yearly Meeting to candidacy for roles on the three councils, offering the names for approval to Friends at its annual sessions and its semi-annual continuing sessions. Friends named to council positions serve for the terms defined in the Yearly Meeting's governance handbook.

Philadelphia Yearly Meeting holds annual sessions for business to which all Friends in the Philadelphia area are invited. These meetings, generally multi-day and residential, take place during the summer months at locations (usually colleges or universities with dormitories) within the four-state area. Annual sessions are an opportunity for Friends to hear about changes to PYM during the previous year, to deliberate on matters brought to them by the councils, and to hear news and reports from other Yearly Meetings. In addition, Friends meet at Arch Street Friends Meeting House in continuing sessions held in March and November for worship and business matters which cannot wait for annual sessions.

The Presiding Clerk officiates at the business sessions of Philadelphia Yearly Meeting. The website of the Yearly Meeting describes this role:

"[The Presiding Clerk's] primary responsibility is to be present, modeling spiritual grounding and discernment, joining with those gathered to remain in worship with an attention to business and clerk accordingly. The clerk is the primary clerk for Annual and Continuing Sessions, preparing the agenda and the people who will be presenting or reporting. The clerk provides support and serves as a strategic thought partner to the General Secretary. They remain informed and knowledgeable about concerns before and the work of the governing councils."

The Yearly Meeting is overseen by a General Secretary. Chris Mohr is the current general secretary and has been since the retirement of the previous general secretary, Christie Duncan-Tessmer, in the fall of 2025.

Philadelphia Yearly Meeting regularly reaffirms its commitment to the practices of diversity, equity, and inclusion in its relations with Friends and with society.

== Collaboratives ==
Presently, the PYM is involved with 7 collaborative initiatives. Each initiative is made up of a committee of like-minded Friends to evaluate and address issues.

- Addressing Racism Collaborative
- Eco-Justice Collaborative
- First Contact Reconciliation Collaborative
- Friends Ending Gun Violence Collaborative
- India Friends Collaborative
- Middle East Collaborative
- Spiritual Formation Collaborative

== Friends in education ==
Westtown School, which was founded before the schism, and Haverford College and Bryn Mawr College became the educational mainstays of the Orthodox yearly meeting. George School and Swarthmore College were founded to provide education for the Hicksite students. While Westtown and George Schools remain under the indirect supervision of the reunited Yearly Meeting, both are functionally and financially independent of the Yearly Meeting, as are other Friends Schools in the area. They may be governed by members of the Society of Friends, but they are structurally independent of the Monthly and Yearly Meetings. Bryn Mawr and Haverford Colleges have no formal relationship with the meeting.
