= Northern Yearly Meeting =

Northern Yearly Meeting (NYM) is a Yearly Meeting of the Religious Society of Friends (Quakers). It is affiliated with the Friends General Conference. The Northern Yearly Meeting consists of meetings and worship groups from the upper midwest of The United States, with member groups in Iowa, Michigan, Minnesota, North Dakota, and Wisconsin.

The Annual Sessions of the Yearly Meeting are held over Memorial Day weekend, historically in Wisconsin.

== History ==
Northern Yearly Meeting started as Northern Half-Yearly Meeting in 1960. Around 1975 the group became Northern Yearly Meeting around due to increased membership.

== Meetings Affiliated with the Northern Yearly Meeting ==
- Beloit Friends Meeting
- Bismarck-Mandan Religious Society of Friends (Quakers)
- Brainerd Friends Meeting,
- Cannon Valley Friends Meeting
- Dodgeville Friends Worship Group
- Dubuque Friends Worship Group
- Duluth-Superior Friends Meeting
- Eau Claire Friends Meeting
- Fox Valley Friends Meeting
- Grand Rapids Friends Worship Group
- Interlake Friends Meeting
- Keweenaw Friends Meeting
- Kenosha-Racine Friends Worship Group
- Kickapoo Valley Friends Meeting
- La Crosse Friends Worship Group
- Lake Superior Friends Meeting,
- Madison Friends Meeting
- Menomonie Friends Meeting
- Milwaukee Friends Meeting
- Minneapolis Friends Meeting
- North Central Wisconsin Friends Worship Group
- Northern Light Preparative Meeting
- Northern Pines Worship Group
- Oshkosh Friends Meeting
- Prospect Hill Friends Meeting
- Red River Friends Monthly Meeting
- Richland Friends Worship Group
- Rochester Friends Meeting
- Saint Croix Valley Friends Meeting
- Sand Ridge Friends Worship Group
- South Dakota Friends
- Stevens Point Friends Meeting
- Twin Cities Friends Meeting
- West Side Worship Group
- Willmar Friends Worship Group
- Winnebago Friends Worship Group
- Winona Friends Preparatory Meeting
