= Yearly Meeting =

Regional associations of Quaker congregations that meet annually

Yearly Meeting is an organization composed of constituent meetings or churches of the Religious Society of Friends, or Quakers, within a geographical area. The constituent meetings are called Monthly Meetings in most of the world; in England, local congregations are now called Area Meetings, in Australia Monthly Meetings are called Regional Meetings. "Monthly" and "Yearly" refer to how often the body meets to make decisions. Monthly Meetings may be local congregations that hold regular Meetings for Worship, or may comprise a number of Worship Groups (and equivalent congregations with other designations). Depending on the Yearly Meeting organization, there may also be Quarterly Meetings, Half-Yearly Meetings, or Regional Meetings, where a number of local Monthly Meetings come together within a Yearly Meeting.

There are also parallel Yearly Meetings for young Quakers, Junior Yearly Meetings.

== General description ==
Yearly Meeting gatherings are times for Friends from a wide geographical area to come together to worship and to seek God's guidance on decisions and on issues facing Friends in that region. Yearly Meetings publish guiding principles, organizational processes, and collected expressions of faith of the constituent Friends. These publications are called Faith and Practice, and/or Books of Discipline.

== Origin ==
Like many aspects of Quakerism, the organization into Yearly Meetings arose gradually. English Friends began to meet shortly after their beginning in a large group starting in the 1650s. The oldest Yearly Meeting in Britain, Britain Yearly Meeting (originally London Yearly Meeting), considers the year 1668 its official founding. New England Yearly Meeting dates its founding from 1661. In the early days the business of the meeting was to receive answers to the Yearly Meeting's queries to the Quarterly Meetings, to read epistles from traveling Friends, and to seek God's guidance on actions. They also proposed and planned the establishment of Quaker institutions, such as schools.

As the Religious Society of Friends grew and spread around the world, new Yearly Meetings were established. While often influenced by the activities of other Yearly Meetings, each of the Yearly Meetings is autonomous.

== Procedure ==
A session of a Yearly Meeting, as with all Quaker business sessions, is considered a time of worship in dealing with matters of business. When a matter has been presented and explained, the Friends who are gathered wait in silence, listening to the leading of God's spirit within them. Those who feel led to do so share their insights, while the others listen. Eventually a "sense of the meeting" begins to emerge. The clerk of the meeting (a type of facilitator) or the Recording Clerk (a person who writes the minutes) tries to formulate a minute that reflects the sense of the meeting. More input may follow. When it is clear that there is agreement, the sense of the meeting is recorded in the minute. Some Friends at the meeting may have reservations about the matter but choose to defer to the others. Friends believe and hope that the minute is God's will on the matter. However, nothing is considered a permanent and inviolable law among Friends and every matter is open to future change.

Before the close of a yearly meeting, Friends write an epistle to communicate to other Friends world-wide. It is the custom to read out selections from epistles the Yearly Meeting has received from other Quaker bodies during yearly meeting sessions.

All Friends who are members of a constituent Meeting are members of the corresponding Yearly Meeting and may attend and participate on an equal basis—there is no hierarchy within the Religious Society of Friends. Many specific issues of concern to Quakers are dealt with by committees appointed by Yearly Meetings.

== Names ==
Yearly Meetings are named for where they meet: a nation (e.g., Canadian Yearly Meeting), a region within a nation (e.g., New England Yearly Meeting), a state (e.g. Indiana Yearly Meeting), or a large city that serves as a hub (e.g., Philadelphia Yearly Meeting). The entire name of a Yearly Meeting usually includes the words "of the Religious Society of Friends" (e.g., New York Yearly Meeting of the Religious Society of Friends) although some do not (e.g., Northern Yearly Meeting).

== Junior Yearly Meeting ==
Junior Yearly Meeting (JYM) is a gathering for young Quakers. There are various JYM groups worldwide, which cover the same geographical boundaries as their respective Yearly Meeting. Most countries have one Yearly Meeting which corresponds to national borders, but in the United States there are Yearly Meetings on regional, state and city level, and this is reflected in their JYMs. The frequency and age range of gatherings varies between JYMs.

In Britain, JYM is a residential annual gathering, held at a different time to the Britain Yearly Meeting all-age gathering, of about 140 16- to 18-year-olds from around the country and a few Friends from European Yearly Meetings. Each Monthly meeting within Britain Yearly Meeting nominates two young people to attend as representatives, and each of the Friends Schools in Britain (but not Northern Ireland) Quaker School also nominates two young people as representatives. The event is organised, clerked and facilitated by 16- to 18-year-olds in partnership with staff and adult volunteers (Over 20s). Participants reflect on the theme through a variety of activities, including main speaker sessions, base groups and small group sessions. There are also a wide range of topical workshops.

In the United States, JYM gatherings take place either alongside the annual Yearly Meeting gathering, as a separate annual gathering, as in Britain, or as more frequent gatherings.

Baltimore Yearly Meeting, also has a JYM that composed of Young Friends (YF), who are 14–18, and Junior Young Friends (JYF) who are 11–13. BYM YFs are self-governed, choosing two clerks annually, and they conduct conferences throughout the year in addition to meeting at the BYM Annual Session. JYFs are not self-governing, but still conduct business meetings and hold conferences throughout the year. Most conferences are themed, and all include adult volunteers whose responsibilities usually consist of ensuring the YFs and JYFs safety rather than directing them.

== Larger groups ==
Many Yearly Meetings are members of larger groups. In the United States and a few other countries the three main groups of Friends are Friends General Conference, Friends United Meeting, and Evangelical Friends International. A broader group that crosses theological, organizational, and national lines and encourages communication and cooperation of the different groups is Friends World Committee for Consultation.

== List of yearly meetings ==
=== Africa ===
- Burundi Yearly Meeting
- Central and Southern Africa Yearly Meeting
- Congo Yearly Meeting
- East Africa Yearly Meeting
- Kenya (see also Quakers in Kenya)
  - Bware Yearly Meeting, based in Suna
  - Central Yearly Meeting, based in Kakamega
  - Chavakali Yearly Meeting
  - East Africa Yearly Meeting (Kaimosi), based in Tiriki
  - East Africa Yearly Meeting (North), based in Kitale
  - Elgon East Yearly Meeting, based in Kitale
  - Elgon Religious Society of Friends (West), based in Lugulu Via Webuye
  - Kakamega Yearly Meeting
  - Lugari Yearly Meeting, based in Turbo
  - Malava Yearly Meeting
  - Nairobi Yearly Meeting
  - Tuoli Yearly Meeting, based in Kapsabet
  - Vihiga Yearly Meeting
  - Vokoli Yearly Meeting, based in Wodanga
- Tanzania Yearly Meeting
- Uganda Yearly Meeting

=== Americas ===
See also Quakers in Latin America

- Bolivia
  - Iglesia Evangélica Amigos Central (Central Evangelical Friends Church)
  - Iglesia Evangélica Unión Boliviana "Amigos" (Bolivian Union Evangelical Friends Church)
  - Iglesia Nacional Evangélica Los Amigos de Bolivia (National Evangelical Friends Church of Bolivia)
  - Iglesia Evangélica Misión Boliviana de Santidad Amigos (Bolivian Evangelical Mission Church of Holiness Friends)
- Canada
  - Canadian Yearly Meeting
- Cuba
  - Cuba Yearly Meeting
- Guatemala
  - Iglesia Evangélica Embajadores Amigos (Evangelical Ambassadors Friends Church)
  - Iglesia Evangélica Nacional Amigos de Guatemala (National Evangelical Friends Church of Guatemala)
  - Junta Anual Amigos de Santidad (Friends of Holiness Yearly Meeting)
- El Salvador
  - Iglesias Evangélicas de los Amigos en El Salvador (Evangelical Friends Churches in El Salvador)
- Honduras
  - Junta Annual Amigos de Santidad (Friends of Holiness Yearly Meeting)
- Jamaica
  - Jamaica Yearly Meeting
- Mexico
  - Asociación Religiosa de las Iglesias Evangélicas de los Amigos (Religious Association of the Evangelical Churches of Friends)
  - Reunion General de los Amigos en México (General Meeting of Friends in Mexico)
- Peru
  - Iglesia Nacional Evangélica Los Amigos del Perú (National Evangelical Friends Church of Peru)
- United States
  - Conservative
    - Iowa Yearly Meeting (Conservative)—Meetings for Worship in Iowa, Minnesota, Missouri, Nebraska, South Dakota, and Wisconsin.
    - North Carolina Yearly Meeting—Meetings for Worship in North Carolina, Virginia Beach, VA, and Florida.
    - Ohio Yearly Meeting—Meetings for Worship in Ohio, Georgia, Michigan, Pennsylvania, Virginia, and West Virginia. This Meeting offers "affiliate membership" for individual Friends or small congregations worldwide isolated from other Conservative Meetings. Affiliates are as far away as Midlands in England and Athens, Greece.
  - Evangelical Friends International
    - Alaska Yearly Meeting —Meetings for Worship in Alaska.
    - Evangelical Friends Church—Eastern Region—Meetings for Worship in Florida, Michigan, North Carolina, Ohio, Pennsylvania, Rhode Island, and Virginia.
    - Evangelical Friends Church—Mid-America—Meetings for Worship in Colorado, Kansas, Missouri, Oklahoma, and Texas.
    - Evangelical Friends Church—Southwest—Arizona, California, and Nevada.
    - Northwest Yearly Meeting—Meetings for Worship in Idaho, Oregon, and Washington State.
    - Rocky Mountain Yearly Meeting—Meetings for Worship in Arizona, Colorado, and Nebraska.
  - Friends General Conference
    - Alaska Friends Conference
    - Baltimore Yearly Meeting—Meetings for Worship in the District of Columbia, Maryland, Pennsylvania, Virginia, and West Virginia. (Participates in both Friends General Conference and Friends United Meeting)
    - Illinois Yearly Meeting—Meetings for Worship in Missouri, Illinois, and Indiana.
    - Intermountain Yearly Meeting—Meetings for Worship in Arizona, Colorado, New Mexico, South Dakota, Texas, and Utah.
    - Lake Erie Yearly Meeting—Meetings for Worship in Michigan, Ohio, and Pennsylvania.
    - New England Yearly Meeting—Meetings for Worship in Connecticut, Maine, Massachusetts, New Hampshire, Rhode Island, and Vermont. (Participates in both Friends General Conference and Friends United Meeting)
    - New York Yearly Meeting—Meetings for Worship in Connecticut, New Jersey, and New York. (Participates in both Friends General Conference and Friends United Meeting)
    - Northern Yearly Meeting—Meetings for Worship in Iowa, Michigan, Minnesota, North Dakota, and Wisconsin. (Participates in both Friends General Conference and Friends United Meeting)
    - Ohio Valley Yearly Meeting—Meetings for Worship in Indiana, Kentucky, and Ohio.
    - Philadelphia Yearly Meeting—Meetings for Worship in Delaware, Maryland, New Jersey, and Pennsylvania.
    - Piedmont Friends Fellowship (PFF is a fellowship of monthly meetings and a yearly meeting)—Meetings for Worship in North Carolina, Virginia and Lyman, South Carolina.
    - South Central Yearly Meeting—Meetings for Worship in Arkansas, Louisiana, Missouri, Oklahoma, and Texas.
    - Southeastern Yearly Meeting—Meetings for Worship in Florida, Georgia, and South Carolina. (Participates in both Friends General Conference and Friends United Meeting)
    - Southern Appalachian Yearly Meeting Association—Meetings for Worship in Alabama, Georgia, Kentucky, Mississippi, North Carolina, South Carolina, Tennessee and West Virginia.
  - Friends United Meeting
    - Baltimore Yearly Meeting—Meetings for Worship in the District of Columbia, Maryland, Pennsylvania, and Virginia. (Participates in both Friends General Conference and Friends United Meeting)
    - Great Plains Yearly Meeting—Meetings for Worship in Kansas, Nebraska, and Oklahoma.
    - Indiana Yearly Meeting—Meetings for Worship in Indiana, Michigan, and Ohio.
    - Iowa Yearly Meeting (FUM)—Meetings for Worship in Iowa, Minnesota, and Wisconsin.
    - New Association of Friends—Meetings for Worship in Indiana, Iowa, Michigan, and Ohio.
    - New England Yearly Meeting—Meetings for Worship in Connecticut, Maine, Massachusetts, New Hampshire, Rhode Island, and Vermont. (Participates in both Friends General Conference and Friends United Meeting)
    - New York Yearly Meeting—Meetings for Worship in Connecticut, New Jersey, and New York. (Participates in both Friends General Conference and Friends United Meeting)
    - North Carolina Yearly Meeting (FUM)—Meetings for Worship in North Carolina and Virginia.
    - Northern Yearly Meeting—Meetings for Worship in Iowa, Michigan, Minnesota, North Dakota, and Wisconsin. (Participates in both Friends General Conference and Friends United Meeting)
    - Southeastern Yearly Meeting—Meetings for Worship in Florida, Georgia, and South Carolina. (Participates in both Friends General Conference and Friends United Meeting)
    - Western Association of the Religious Society of Friends (WARSF)—Meeting for Worship in Whittier, CA.
    - Western Yearly Meeting—Meetings for Worship in Illinois and Indiana.
    - Wilmington Yearly Meeting—Meetings for Worship in Ohio and Tennessee.
  - Independent
    - Central Yearly Meeting—Meetings for Worship in Arkansas, Indiana, North Carolina, and Ohio. According to Quaker historian Ben Pink Dandelion, "Central Yearly Meeting has little or no contact with the rest of the Quaker world. It broke away from Five Years Meeting in 1926 and represents a Holiness Yearly Meeting."
    - Missouri Valley Friends Conference
    - North Pacific Yearly Meeting—Meetings for Worship in Idaho, Montana, Oregon, Washington, and Wyoming. (A Beanite yearly meeting with informal ties to Friends General Conference, some Monthly Meetings are affiliated with FGC).
    - Pacific Yearly Meeting—Meetings for Worship in California, Hawaii, Mexico, and Guatemala. (A Beanite yearly meeting with informal ties to Friends General Conference, some Monthly Meetings are affiliated with FGC).
    - Sierra-Cascades Yearly Meeting of Friends—Meetings for Worship in Washington, Oregon, California, and Idaho. It broke from Northwest Yearly Meeting in 2017.

=== Asia ===
- Cambodia Yearly Meeting
- India (General Conference of Friends in India)
  - Bhopal Yearly Meeting
  - Bundelkhand Yearly Meeting (Bundelkhand Masihi Mitr Samaj)
  - Mid-India Yearly Meeting
- Indonesia Yearly Meeting
- Japan Yearly Meeting
- Middle East Yearly Meeting
- (Nepal) Evangelical Friends Church
- Philippine Evangelical Friends Church
- Taiwan Yearly Meeting

=== Australia and Oceania ===
- Australia Yearly Meeting
- Aotearoa/New Zealand Yearly Meeting (Te Hāhi Tūhauwiri)

=== Europe ===
See also Quakers in Europe

- Britain Yearly Meeting
- Denmark Yearly Meeting
- (Hungary) Evangelical Friends Church
- Finland Yearly Meeting
- France Yearly Meeting
- Germany Yearly Meeting (die Deutsche Jahresversammlung, or DJV)—Quaker communities were established in 1677 and 1678 in what is now Germany at Emden and Friedrichstadt (extinct in 1727). English and American Friends organized a Quaker colony in Friedensthal (Peace Valley), which existed from 1792 until 1870 in what is now Bad Pyrmont, a city in the district of Hamelin-Pyrmont, in Lower Saxony (Niedersachsen), Germany. Land was donated for a meeting house in January 1791 and the Quaker House (das Quäkerhaus) was built. In 1933, it was reconstructed and relocated from its original site to Bombergallee 9, Bad Pyrmont. The German Annual Meeting (Deutschen Jahresversammlung) was organized in 1880. Relief work following World War I revitalized German Quakerism. The German Yearly Meeting (die Deutsche Jahresversammlung or DJV) resulted from the 1923 mergers of the German Annual Meeting with the Friends of Quakerism (Freunde des Quäkertums) and, in 1925, the Federation of German Friends (die Bund der deutschen Freunde) and serves as an umbrella organization for the small liberal Quaker presence in Germany and Austria. This body uses a translation of Britain Yearly Meeting's current book of discipline Quaker Faith and Practice: The book of Christian discipline of the Yearly Meeting of the Religious Society of Friends (Quakers) in Britain entitled Quäker—Glaube und Wirken (das Handbuch der Quäker zur christlichen Lebensführung, übersetzt aus dem Englischen)
- Ireland Yearly Meeting
- Netherlands Yearly Meeting
- Norway Yearly Meeting
- Sweden Yearly Meeting
- Switzerland Yearly Meeting

== Sources ==
Pink Dandelion, B. (2007). An Introduction to Quakerism. Cambridge, UK: Cambridge University Press.
