= 57th Street Meeting =

Quaker meeting in Chicago, United States

Coordinates: 41.79282°N 87.59618°W

The 57th Street Meeting of Friends is a Chicago meeting of the Society of Friends (Quakers). It has convened since at least 1916. It originated at the close of the Civil War with 40 members who "commenced regular meetings on first days at 11 o'clock" and "met in the Y.M.C.A. rooms in the First Methodist Church".

In 1993, Michael Szenberg commended the meeting as "very congenial".
