= Baltimore Yearly Meeting =

Religious Society of Friends (Quakers) in the Chesapeake region and West Virginia

- Classification: Quaker
- Associations: Friends General Conference, Friends United Meeting, Friends World Committee for Consultation
- Region: Baltimore, United States
- Origin: 1672
- Official website: www.bym-rsf.org/

Baltimore Yearly Meeting (officially the Baltimore Yearly Meeting' of the Religious Society of Friends) is a body of the Religious Society of Friends (Quakers) headquartered in Sandy Spring, Maryland, that includes Friends from Virginia, Maryland, parts of Pennsylvania, the District of Columbia, and West Virginia. It is one of the oldest yearly meetings in North America, first meeting in May 1672. It is one of two yearly meetings in North America visited by George Fox (the other being New England Yearly Meeting, who visited after a trip to Barbados). Its Presiding Clerk is Stephanie Bean. Baltimore Yearly Meeting (BYM) is part of both Friends General Conference and Friends United Meeting –- two broader bodies of Friends. They are also part of Friends World Committee for Consultation and the Friends Peace Teams Project.

Baltimore Yearly Meeting is composed of fifty local Monthly Meetings. Its constituent Monthly Meetings are in the unprogrammed tradition, which means that they meet for silent worship in which any participant may share whatever they believe the Spirit of God leads them to say.

Baltimore Yearly Meeting has been operating summer camps in the region since the 1920s. Camps currently operated by BYM include Catoctin Quaker Camp, near Frederick, Maryland; Shiloh Quaker Camp, near Charlottesville, Virginia; Opequon Quaker Camp, near Winchester, Virginia; and the Teen Adventure Program, near Lexington, Virginia.

Baltimore Yearly Meeting was home to Tom Fox, who worked with its youth.
