= Britain Yearly Meeting =

Yearly Meeting of the Religious Society of Friends

Coordinates: 54.1864°N 3.1019°W

The Yearly Meeting of the Religious Society of Friends (Quakers) in Britain
- Orientation: Quaker
- Associations: Friends World Committee for Consultation
- Region: England, Scotland, Wales, Channel Islands, Isle of Man
- Founder: George Fox
- Origin: 1652; Pendle Hill, Lancashire (See History of the Quakers)
- Separated from: Church of England
- Congregations: 463 (as of 2020)
- Members: 17,540 members and attenders (as of end of 2022)
- Aid organization: Quaker Peace and Social Witness
- Hospitals: 1
- Secondary schools: 9
- Other names: Britain Yearly Meeting (since 1995); London Yearly Meeting (until 1995); Quakers in Britain
- Official website: www.quaker.org.uk

The Yearly Meeting of the Religious Society of Friends (Quakers) in Britain, also known as Britain Yearly Meeting (and, until 1995, London Yearly Meeting), is a Yearly Meeting of the Religious Society of Friends (Quakers) in England, Scotland, Wales, the Channel Islands and the Isle of Man. It is the national organisation of Quakers living in Britain. Britain Yearly Meeting refers to both the religious gathering and the organisation. "Yearly Meeting", or "Yearly Meeting Gathering" are usually the names given to the annual gathering of British Quakers. Quakers in Britain is the name the organisation is commonly known by.

== History ==
=== First Quaker meetings in Britain (1654–1672) ===
Britain Yearly Meeting, which until 1995 was known as London Yearly Meeting, grew out of various national and regional meetings of Friends in the 1650s and 1660s and has met annually in some form since 1668. The first meeting of Friends from different parts of Britain to be organised was at Balby in Yorkshire in 1656. This consisted of representatives from meetings in Yorkshire, Lincolnshire, Derbyshire and Nottinghamshire "to consider of such things as might (in the Truth's behalf) be propounded unto them; and to enquire into the cause and matter of disorder, if any be". The Quaker book of discipline, Quaker Faith and Practice recalls that:

We may think of that at Swannington in 1654 or Balby in 1656 (the postscript to whose lengthy letter of counsel is so much better known than the letter itself) or Skipton the same year, or the general meeting for the whole nation held at Beckerings Park, the Bedfordshire home of John Crook, for three days in May 1658, and attended by several thousand Friends. This in some ways might be considered the first Yearly Meeting were it not for the fact that the 1660s, through persecution and pestilence, saw breaks in annual continuity. The meeting in May 1668 was followed by one at Christmastime, which lasted into 1669, since when the series has been unbroken. It is 1668, therefore, that we have traditionally chosen as the date of establishment of London Yearly Meeting. But many (though not all) of the meetings up to 1677 were select, that is, confined to "publick" (or ministering) Friends: from 1678 they were representative rather than select in character.

=== Seventeenth century ===
==== Establishment of Yearly Meetings (1672) ====
In 1660 was a meeting which was attended by representatives of Friends from the whole of England and Wales. At this meeting it was decided that an annual "General Assembly of the Brethren" be held in London annually, the first being held in Fifth Month (May) 1661. For various reasons, this meeting was not at first held every year, although there has been a national annual meeting of some sort in every year since 1668.

At the "General Meeting of Friends for the Nation" in 1672, it was decided that there would be a:

Generall Meeting of friends held in London once a yeare in the week called Whisun week to consist of six friends for the Citty of London, three for the Citty of Bristoll, two for the Towne of Cochester and one or two from each and every of the Counties of England and Wales respectively (sic)

Minutes are preserved from 1672 which record that this meeting was held in 1673, and from 1674 to 1677 consisted only of recorded ministers. The Yearly Meeting with representatives from each area as described above was restored in 1678, and has met on an annual basis every year since then.

==== The end of official persecution in England (1689) ====
Under King James II, persecution of nonconformists practically ceased. James issued a Declaration of Indulgence in 1687 and 1688, and it was widely held that William Penn had been its author.

In 1689 the Toleration Act was passed. It allowed for freedom of conscience and prevented persecution by making it illegal to disturb anybody else from worship. Thus Quakerism became tolerated, although still not widely understood or accepted, and Quakers were instead identified in English and Welsh law as a dissenting group.

From almost the very beginning of the movement in the middle seventeenth century, Quakers became notable in the popular imagination not merely for their radical religious ideas and seemingly peculiar social habits but also for their legendary willingness to be jailed or punished for their beliefs.

=== Eighteenth century ===
During the first full century of Quakerism, Quakers underwent a transformation from enemies of the Church of England to quiet pursuit of inward faith. Responding to the struggles and persecution of the seventeenth century, Friends insisted on pursuing a practice of "peculiarity" to protect Quaker communities. This often meant that the business of monthly meetings was taken up with incidents of "outside marriage" and Friends who had chosen a path upon which to "walk disorderly". Women were entitled to remain single or choose to defer marriage and according to James Jenkins' records of the time, Quakers recognised the presence of a "call" or "service in all" that existed "beyond their function in family". This parity of roles may have led to a higher rate of literacy for Quaker women than for women in Britain at large during the eighteenth century. Employment and civil rights were a major Quaker concern during this period. John Bellers, a Fellow of the Royal Society and educational theorist called for "the rich to take care of the poor and their education" and in his 1714 text, About the Improvement of Physick advocated for a national system of hospitals to treat the poor and train doctors, a precursor to the National Health Service.

Throughout the century there were a significant number of Quakers who travelled as missionaries to Europe, the Americas, and Africa. Quaker missionaries from England were supported spiritually, financially, and logistically by London Yearly Meeting. The Yearly Meeting "routinely funded" transatlantic crossings for Quaker ministers to Pennsylvania. However, within British society this period is marked as an "inward" era – more commonly known as the Quietist period (a reference to early Christian Quietists). Influenced by Quietists such as Jeanne-Marie Bouvier de la Motte-Guyon, François Fénelon, and Miguel de Molinos, the spiritual practices of nonviolence and inward nourishment resonated with Quaker testimony and significant numbers of Friends adopted plain dress and a "concern against ostentation".

==== Yearly Meeting for Women (1784–1907) ====
Participation in Yearly Meeting was originally limited to men but in 1784, the Yearly Meeting for Women was established, which corresponded with equivalent Yearly Meetings for Women abroad, and corresponded with the Monthly Meetings for Women and Quarterly Meetings for Women in Britain. In 1898, London Yearly Meeting produced a minute stating that:

in future, women Friends are to be recognized as forming a constituent part of all our Meetings for Church Affairs equally with their brethren

and since then women have had an equal right to attend London Yearly Meeting. The Yearly Meeting for Women was laid down in 1907.

=== Nineteenth century ===
The actions of British Quakers in the nineteenth century can be characterised by political activism (political and philanthropic), social reform, and industry. The society underwent a number of changes and series of revisions to the Quietist method which ultimately led to the breakaway denominations of Hicksite, Gurneys, White Quakers, Waterites, and Fritchley General Meeting. London Yearly Meeting in the nineteenth century was a central base for political activity, allowing individual Quakers to "distribute doctrine and ideas" supported by the centrally managed Yearly Meeting based at Devonshire House. A significant number of Quakers began to take seats in Parliament during the nineteenth century. Amongst them, Joseph Pease, John Bright, Fowell Buxton, John Ellis, Edmund Backhouse, and Charles Gilpin. Bright was a vocal opponent to the Crimean War, the Quaker peace testimony a central part of his pacifism and campaign, beginning a thirty-year tenure as the MP for Birmingham from 1857–1885. Fowell Buxton was a prolific campaigner for the abolition of slavery, founding the Anti-Slavery Society with Joseph Pease (younger) in 1823 and becoming leader of the abolition movement following William Wilberforce in 1825. Joseph Pease served as the president of the Peace Society for twelve years alongside the Quaker scientist and philanthropist William Allen.

In 1818 on capital punishment Yearly Meeting was not merely preoccupied with introspective consideration of the state of the Society: it sought to awaken the public conscience. A statement in 1856 on liberty of conscience was translated into half a dozen languages and taken by deputations of concerned Friends to ecclesiastics and statesmen from Madrid to St Petersburg.

==== Fritchley General Meeting (1868) ====
Fritchley Meeting in Derbyshire split off from London Yearly Meeting in 1868 because they felt that London Yearly Meeting was becoming too evangelical in its outlook. They also objected to Friends in London Yearly Meeting stopping the practices of plain speech and plain dress. They therefore established Fritchley General Meeting as a self-proclaimed Yearly Meeting for Conservative Friends in Britain, which existed as a separate Yearly Meeting entirely independent of London Yearly Meeting, until 1968. Friends from Bournbrook in Birmingham also joined with Fritchley Friends for a few years, before emigrating to Saskatchewan in Canada. The separation was healed in 1968 with Fritchley Meeting rejoining London Yearly Meeting. Fritchley Quaker Meeting is now a full member of Britain Yearly Meeting, with a variety of theological outlooks amongst its membership.

=== Twentieth century ===
==== Meetings outside London ====
In the twentieth century, Yearly Meetings started to be held outside London, namely in Leeds in 1905; in Birmingham in 1908; in Manchester in 1912; in Llandrindrod Wells in 1924; in Scarborough in 1925; in Manchester in 1926; in Bristol in 1937; In York in 1941 and in 1942. in Edinburgh in 1948. In 1945, London Yearly Meeting produced a minute stating that the Yearly Meeting should be held in Eighth Month (August) outside London every four years. These four-yearly meetings, which have become known as "Residential Yearly Meetings" have been held in Exeter in 1986; in Aberdeen in 1989; in Coventry in 1993; in Aberystwyth in 1997; in Exeter in 2001; in York in 2005; in York again in 2009; and in Canterbury in 2011.

London Yearly Meeting in 1994 decided on a change of name to "The Yearly Meeting of the Religious Society of Friends (Quakers) in Britain" in 1994, with the short form being "Britain Yearly Meeting". This name change came into effect at the start of 1995.

== Organisational structure ==
Britain Yearly Meeting is the name used to refer to both the Yearly Meeting of Quakers and the central organisation of Quakers in Britain, based in Friends House, London. Britain Yearly Meeting is the national organisation of Quakers in Britain. Its membership consists of the members of all Area Meetings in England, Scotland, Wales, the Isle of Man, the Channel Islands. Any member of Britain Yearly Meeting is entitled to attend the Yearly Meeting gathering.

The national work of Quakers in Britain is undertaken by Meeting for Sufferings and four central standing committees. The committees are composed of representatives from Meetings throughout Britain. This correspondence and representation means that Quakers in Britain can have unified response on major issues. The central work of Meeting for Sufferings and the standing committees is supported by the staff of Britain Yearly Meeting who work from Friends House (Euston), Edinburgh, Swarthmoor Hall and Vibrancy teams whose work covers large areas of Britain.

=== Central committees ===
There are committees set up to deal with particular issues, including long running committees consisting of representatives from all over Britain: Meeting for Sufferings, Quaker Life and Quaker Peace and Social Witness.

==== Meeting for Sufferings ====
Meeting for Sufferings is a national representative committee which deals with decisions which need to be made on a national basis for the Yearly Meeting during the year whilst Yearly Meeting is not in session. It has two representatives from each Area Meeting in England, Wales, Scotland, the Isle of Man and the Channel Islands. Quakers in Scotland (until 2025 General Meeting for Scotland) is a member of the ecumenical organisation Action of Churches Together in Scotland.

==== Standing Committees ====
Britain Yearly Meeting currently has four standing committees who carry out work at a national level on behalf of Friends in Britain. Each have representative committees of Friends appointed by Meeting for Sufferings, and accountable to British Yearly Meeting trustees, to oversee the work, as well as a paid secretariat who carry out the day-to-day work of each department:

- Quaker Life Central Committee deals with the running of Quaker meetings within Britain, including outreach work within Britain, education and development for Quakers in Britain, activities for children and young people.
- Quaker Peace and Social Witness deals with Quakers' peace and development work, both in Britain and overseas.
- Quaker World Relations Committee maintains contact with other yearly meetings and with Friends World Committee for Consultation and its Europe & Middle East Section to which Britain Yearly Meeting is affiliated.
- Quaker Committee on Christian and Interfaith Relations deals with relationships between Quakers and other Christian and faith groups.

Britain Yearly Meeting assembles and publishes a book of discipline, which since 1995 has been known as Quaker faith & practice. In 2018, Britain Yearly Meeting decided to revise Quaker faith & practice.

== Yearly meeting ==
Before 2009, three out of four yearly meetings of BYM were held at Friends House over one of the May bank holiday weekends, and once every four years a week-long Residential Meeting was held in the summer. In a change to this practice, the first Yearly Meeting Gathering (YMG) was held in York in 2009, with the 2010 Yearly Meeting being held at Friends House in London on May. The second YMG was held in Canterbury in 2011. A new three-year rotation has been established with Yearly Meetings being held two years running at Friends House, and the third year as a residential YMG.

All types of issues are discussed in the standard fashion of Quaker decision making. Among several lectures over the gathering, one of the highlights is known as the Swarthmore Lecture, relating to issues concerning Quakers. There is also an under 19's programme, with activities tailored to each age group.

Year	Date	Location
2005	30 July–6 August	A residential Yearly Meeting held at the University of York.
2006	26–29 May	YMG 2006 took place at Friends House in London over the second May Bank Holiday in the UK
2007	4–7 May	YMG 2007 took place at Friends House in London over the first May Bank Holiday in the UK
2008	23–26 May	YMG 2008 took place at Friends House in London over the second May Bank Holiday in the UK
2009	25 July–1 August	A residential Yearly Meeting Gathering was held at the University of York. For the first time this encompassed Junior Yearly Meeting (JYM) and merged both Yearly Meeting and the scheduled Summer Gathering into Yearly Meeting Gathering, a new biennial event.
2010	28–31 May	YMG 2010 took place at Friends House in London over the second May Bank Holiday in the UK
2011	30 July–6 August	YMG 2011 took place in Canterbury.
2012	25–28 May	YMG 2012 took place at Friends House in London.
2013	24–27 May	YMG 2013 took place at Friends House in London over the second May Bank Holiday in the UK
2014	2–9 August	YMG 2014 took place at the University of Bath.
2015	1–4 May	YMG 2015 took place at Friends House in London.
2016	27–30 May	YMG 2016 took place at Friends House in London.
2017	27 July–5 August	YMG 2017 took place at the University of Warwick.
2018	4–7 May	YMG 2018 took place at Friends House.
2019	24–27 May	YM 2019 took place at Friends House.
2020	15 November	YM 2020 took place online due to restrictions in place for the COVID-19 pandemic.
2021	19 July–8 August	YMG 2021 took place online due to the COVID-19 pandemic.

=== Events for young Quakers ===
==== Under 19s Programme ====
The Under 19s Programme is held during the annual Britain Yearly Meeting and is attended by young Quakers aged 0 to 19, with appropriate age grouping (i.e. 0–3,...,15–18). The programme aims to provide young Friends with an insight to Quaker beliefs and values, as well as providing a safe environment for relationship building within the society.

==== Junior Yearly Meeting ====
Junior Yearly Meeting, commonly known as "JYM", is an event for young Quakers aged 14 to 18. The annual event is normally held around the Easter holidays at the Pioneer Centre in Kidderminster, and coincides biennially with Yearly Meeting Gathering in late July. It acts as a stepping stone for the transition from the Under 19s Programme into the Society of Friends.

== Relationship with international Friends ==
Britain Yearly Meeting participates in the international Religious Society of Friends through the Friends World Committee for Consultation. Britain Yearly Meeting also contributes a large portion of the Quaker United Nations Office budget, through Quaker Peace and Social Witness.

Communications between Yearly Meetings take the form of epistles. Formerly these would be individually addressed to other Yearly Meetings, but now epistles are posted online by the Friends World Committee for Consultation. Quakers are a highly decentralized denomination with a great degree of diversity in beliefs and practices. Britain Yearly Meeting worships in a way that is most similar to Ireland, Canada, Australia and US Yearly Meetings affiliated with the Friends General Conference characterized by unprogrammed worship and liberal to universalist theology.

== See also ==
- Book of Discipline
- Friends House
- George Fox
- Junior Young Friends
- List of Quakers
- Margaret Fell
- Meeting for Sufferings
- Quaker Life
- Quaker Peace and Social Witness
- Swarthmoor Hall
- Swarthmore Lecture
- Szechwan Yearly Meeting
- Young Friends General Meeting
