= New York Yearly Meeting =

Coordinates: 43°41′38″N 73°30′21″W

Statistics (June 1, 2019)
- Total Members: 2,987
- Adults: 2,826
- Youth: 161

New York Yearly Meeting of the Religious Society of Friends, or New York Yearly Meeting or NYYM, is the central organizing body for Quaker meetings and worship groups in New York State, northern and central New Jersey, and southwestern Connecticut.

== Regional meetings ==
Monthly meetings in the yearly meeting are grouped into nine regional meetings that usually meet four times a year (hence most are called quarterly meetings). They are:

- All Friends Regional Meeting
- Butternuts Quarterly Meeting
- Farmington-Scipio Regional Meeting
- Long Island Quarterly Meeting
- New York Quarterly Meeting
- Nine Partners Quarterly Meeting
- Northeastern Regional Meeting
- Purchase Quarterly Meeting
- Shrewsbury and Plainfield Half-Yearly Meeting

== Summer sessions ==
Summer sessions, often referred to as "yearly meeting" or "Silver Bay" for the camp it is usually held at, is a week-long gathering that all of NYYM is encouraged to attend. Summer sessions serve as an opportunity for Friends to hear about the goings-on in NYYM over the previous year, for committees to meet, for news from other yearly meetings to be shared, and for Friends to foster strong relationships within the Quaker community.

Summer sessions usually held at the Silver Bay YMCA conference center in the Adirondacks.

=== Business meetings ===
During summer sessions the group gathers many times for business meeting, which is worship with a concern for business. During these meetings, decisions are made when the attendees are able to come to spiritual unity (which is not the same as what is commonly known outside Quaker circles as "consensus").

=== Junior yearly meeting ===
During summer sessions most of the youth ages 0–17 participate in junior yearly meeting, or JYM. The youth are divided by age into groups of two or three grades (e.g. 4th and 5th). JYM groups meet each morning and partake in a variety of activities including games, business and committee meetings, exercises on the ropes course, and singing. A large part of the time is spent learning about Quakerism, the yearly meeting, and other topics about which the adults of the yearly meeting hope to educate the next generation.

== Powell House ==
Powell House is the conference and retreat center of New York Yearly Meeting. It is located in Old Chatham, New York.

== Alternatives to Violence Project ==
The Alternatives to Violence Project, or AVP, is a network of volunteer groups whose goal is to reduce violence by providing workshops in which people can learn nonviolent methods of resolving conflict.

AVP was started in 1975 by a group of inmates at Green Haven Prison working in collaboration with New York Yearly Meeting Quakers. It spread throughout the prison system, and eventually into mainstream society.

AVP workshops have been offered many times during NYYM's summer sessions.

There is an ongoing case "Green Haven Prison Preparative Meeting of Religious Society of Friends v. New York State Department of Correctional and Community Supervision" that has reached the supreme court. This case was originally filed by attorney Frederick Dettmer, a member of the NYYM, to protest the disruptment of the regularly scheduled quarterly meetings as well as meetings for worship with a concern for business held with inmates at Green Haven Prison.

== Publications ==
Spark and InfoShare are the two newsletters of New York Yearly Meeting. Spark is published both in print and online five times a year and InfoShare is a monthly email newsletter. The yearly meeting also publishes a version of Faith and Practice, a handbook for NYYM members, and an annual yearbook.
