= Australia Yearly Meeting =

Australia Yearly Meeting is the body of members of the Religious Society of Friends (Quakers) in Australia. Quakers within Australia Yearly Meeting generally follow the unprogrammed style of worship.

Australia Yearly Meeting comprises seven Regional Meetings: New South Wales, Victoria, Tasmania, South Australia, Canberra, Queensland and West Australia Regional Meetings. Regional Meetings, in turn, comprise Local Meetings, Recognised Meetings and Worshipping Groups. There are approximately 2,000 members and attenders in the Quaker community in Australia, of whom 831 are members of the Australia Yearly Meeting (as of 2020).

The annual meetings of Australia Yearly Meeting rotate among the seven Regional Meetings. The Australia Yearly Meeting office is based near the Australia Yearly Meeting Secretary, the only full-time employee, at any given time.

Australia Yearly Meeting was established as an autonomous Yearly Meeting in 1964. Australia Yearly Meeting grew out of the previous Australia General Meeting which first met in 1902 as a component of London Yearly Meeting.
