= New England Yearly Meeting =

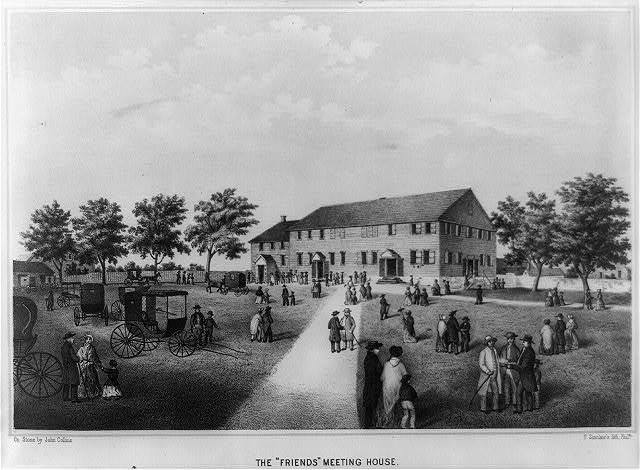
The Great Friends Meetinghouse in Newport, Rhode Island, held the annual meeting until 1905

New England Yearly Meeting (officially the New England Yearly Meeting of Friends) is a body of the Religious Society of Friends (Quakers) founded in 1661 and headquartered in Worcester, Massachusetts. It includes Friends from the New England region of the United States.

New England Yearly Meeting (NEYM) is part of both Friends General Conference and Friends United Meeting—two broader bodies of Friends—as well as Friends World Committee for Consultation and the Friends Peace Teams.

Sixty-eight monthly meetings are associated with NEYM. Most of the constituent monthly meetings are in the unprogrammed tradition, which means that they meet for silent worship in which any participant may share whatever they believe the Spirit of God leads them to say. Others are in the programmed tradition, which means that they have a pastor who leads the meeting and plans ahead of time what will be said and done.

Yearly meeting sessions are held once a year, usually in the first week of August. The 366th annual sessions will be held from July 31 to August 4, 2026 at Mount Holyoke College in South Hadley, Massachusetts. Other past locations include Bryant University in Smithfield, Rhode Island; Stonehill College in North Easton, Massachusetts; Wheaton College in Norton, Massachusetts; Bowdoin College in Brunswick, Maine; Castleton University in Castleton, Vermont; and Hampshire College in Amherst, Massachusetts.

NEYM publishes a quarterly newsletter entitled The New England Friend. For many years, the archives for NEYM were housed in the Rhode Island Historical Society Library in Providence, Rhode Island. In 2016, they were moved to the Special Collections and University Archives in the W. E. B. Du Bois Library at the University of Massachusetts Amherst.

Starting in 1953, NEYM has run a summer camp in South China, Maine called Friends Camp.

2020 saw a virtual meeting, but no summer camp.
