= Ireland Yearly Meeting =

Yearly Meeting of the Religious Society of Friends in Ireland
- Classification: Christian
- Orientation: Quakers
- Polity: Congregationalist polity
- Leader: Changes annually
- Associations: Friends World Committee for Consultation, Irish Council of Churches
- Region: Ireland
- Founder: William Edmundson
- Origin: 1654; Lurgan, County Armagh
- Separated from: Church of Ireland
- Congregations: 26
- Members: 1500
- Aid organization: Irish Quaker Faith in Action (IQFA), Christian Aid
- Hospitals: 1
- Nursing homes: 1
- Primary schools: 1
- Secondary schools: 3
- Official website: quakers-in-ireland.ie

The Ireland Yearly Meeting is the umbrella body for the Religious Society of Friends in Ireland. It is one of many Yearly Meetings (YMs) of Friends around the world. A notable aspect of the Ireland YM is that it encompasses meetings with widely divergent Christian viewpoints from theologically conservative (evangelical) to theologically liberal. All meetings under its purview are in the unprogrammed tradition. It also includes meetings both in the Republic of Ireland and in Northern Ireland.

== Structure ==
In Ireland there are 30 local (preparative) meetings or worship groups. These are grouped into 8 regional Monthly meetings, which are in turn grouped together in 3 provincial (quarterly) meetings, listed below. The three quarterly meetings together constitute the Ireland YM. There are between 1,200-1,600 Friends in Ireland.

- Ulster Quarterly Meeting (UQM)
  - Lisburn Monthly Meeting (Belfast Frederick Street, Londonderry, Coleraine, Hillsborough, Lisburn, South Belfast and Fermanagh)
  - Lurgan Monthly Meeting (Bessbrook, Lurgan, Moyallon)
  - Grange & Richhill Monthly Meeting (Grange, Richhill)
- Leinster Quarterly Meeting (LQM)
  - Dublin Monthly Meeting (Dublin Eustace Street, Churchtown, Drogheda, Edenderry, Monkstown)
  - Wexford Monthly Meeting (Ballitore, Enniscorthy, Kilkenny)
- Munster Quarterly Meeting (MQM)
  - Cork Monthly Meeting (Cork, Bantry, Killarney)
  - Waterford Monthly Meeting (Waterford)
  - Western Regional Monthly Meeting (Limerick, Galway, Westport, Roscrea & Cloughjordan, Scarriff, North-west)

The Friendly Word is a bimonthly magazine published by Quakers in Ireland. The Friends Burial Ground, Dublin is in Temple Hill, Blackrock, County Dublin.

== History ==
The Religious Society of Friends was introduced to Ireland by William Edmundson. He was born in Westmorland, England in 1627 but moved to Ireland in 1652. On a return trip to England, Edmundson was convinced of the truth of Quakerism under the teaching of James Nayler He went back to Ireland and set up a business in Lurgan, County Armagh. The first Friends meeting in Ireland took place in Edmundson's home there in 1654.

Irish Quakers were known for entrepreneurship, setting up many businesses in Ireland, with many families such as the Goodbodys, Bewleys, Pims, Lambs, Jacobs, Edmundsons, Perrys and Bells were involved in milling, textiles, shipping, imports and exports, food and tobacco production, brewing, iron production and railways industries. William Penn the founder of Pennsylvania, converted to Quakerism while dealing with his father's estates in Ireland. He attended meetings in Cork.

The Quakers founded the town of Mountmellick, County Laois, in 1657 led by William Edmundson. There is a Quaker burial ground in Rosenallis, Co, Laois.

Ballitore in County Kildare, in 1685 was planned as a Quaker town, it was here a Quaker school was founded by Abraham Shackleton (ancestor of the polar explorer Ernest Shackleton) in 1726, many Quakers from all over Ireland attended as did many non-Quakers. Among the famous non-Quakers to go there were Henry Grattan, Cardinal Paul Cullen, James Napper Tandy and Edmund Burke.

In 1692 the Quakers opened a meeting house in Sycamore Alley, off Dame Street in Dublin, these premises expanded with the purchase of property backing on to Eustace Street. The Quakers building on Eustace Street, purchased in 1817, is the former Eagle Tavern, it is where the Dublin Society of the United Irishmen was formed in 1791. In 1988 they sold some of their property on Eustace Street, which became the Irish Film Institute.

The Cork Street Fever Hospital, Dublin was founded by Quakers in the early 19th century. The Royal Hospital, Donnybrook in Dublin, was also originally a Quaker hospital. There was a Quaker grave yard in Cork street, and one in York Street off St. Stephen's Green which was sold and for the Building of the Royal College of Surgeons.

The Quakers were known for setting up relief measures in their localities during the Great Famine

Quaker Senator James G. Douglas was chairperson of the committee that drafted the Constitution of the Irish Free State in 1922.

The Society was one of the six religious denominations recognised by article 44.1.3 of the Irish Constitution, which was adopted by popular plebiscite in 1937. This reference was deleted from the constitution via the Fifth Amendment of the Constitution of Ireland in 1972 along with that of the other recognised denominations and the "special position" of the Roman Catholic Church in Ireland.

The Society decided at Ireland Yearly Meeting 2018 to allow same-sex marriages in their Meetings for Worship. The Society was represented at the second inauguration of the President of Ireland Michael D. Higgins in 2018.

== Burial Grounds ==
List of Quaker burial grounds in the Republic of Ireland:

1. Burial Ground at Rosenallis, Co. Laois.
2. Burial Ground, Lower Newtown, Co. Waterford.
3. Burial Ground at Tullamore Road, Edenderry, Co. Offaly.
4. Burial Ground at Newgarden, Co. Carlow.
5. Burial Ground at Knockballymeagher, Co. Tipperary.
6. Burial Ground at Ballymurrinmore, Co. Wicklow.
7. Burial Ground at Mounthrath, Co. Laois.
8. Burial Ground at Cork Street, Dublin City, Co. Dublin.
9. Burial Ground at Moate, Co. Westmeath.
10. Burial Ground at Kilconnithinmore, Co. Tipperary (AKA Quakerstown in the Borrisokane/Cloughjordan area).
11. Burial Ground at Templehill, Blackrock, Co. Dublin.
12. Burial Ground at Youghal, Co. Cork.
13. Burial Ground at Cooladine, Enniscorthy, Co. Wexford.
14. Burial Ground at Ballinclay, Clogh near Camolin, Co. Wexford.
15. Burial Ground at New Ross, Co. Wexford.
16. Burial Ground at Forest, Near Taghmon, Co. Wexford.
17. Burial Ground at Summerhill South, Cork City, Co. Cork.
18. Burial Ground at Ballinacurra, Limerick City, Co. Limerick.
19. Burial Ground at Edenderry, Co. Offaly.
20. Burial Ground at Ballybrads, Cahir, Co. Tipperary.

== Archives ==
The Archives of the Religious Society of Friends are held in Quaker House, Stocking Lane, Rathfarnham, Dublin 16 and Meeting House, Lisburn, County Antrim.
