= Clerk (Quaker) =

Within the Religious Society of Friends, a clerk is someone responsible for various administrative functions within a meeting for worship for church affairs or meeting for worship with attention to business. The clerk is responsible for recording the discernment which is arrived at during such a meeting, in a minute, and is responsible for sending and receiving correspondence on behalf of the meeting. Within some branches of the Religious Society of Friends, the clerk may also create an agenda and may facilitate the meeting.

Friends record minutes contemporaneously, with each minute written during the meeting for worship for business. At the end of each item, the clerk will present a draft minute and ask the meeting if the minute is acceptable. The final minute will only be recorded when all Friends present feel that the minute is an accurate record of what the "sense of the meeting" was. In Britain, when members of the meeting wish to indicate their approval of a minute, they will sometimes say "hope so".

In some Quaker groups, there may be more than one person performing clerking roles, for example the role of facilitating the meeting may be separate from recording minutes. In this case different names may be given to the different clerks—e.g. co-clerk, recording clerk, presiding clerk, assistant clerk, reading clerk, epistle clerk, or correspondence clerk.

Some Friends groups, particularly ones who do not have regular minuted meetings for worship for business, may have some of the roles usually carried out by a clerk carried out by a correspondent (who is responsible for sending and receiving correspondence on behalf of the meeting) or a convenor (who is responsible for bringing people together for a meeting—this is a term often used for someone who co-ordinates a committee).

In Quaker meetings, there are often committees and temporary working groups that perform duties and oversee activities of the meeting. Most committees will have their own clerk or convenor who will convene meetings and record minutes.

== Bibliography ==
- Hickey, Damon D (1987). "Unforeseen Joy" Serving a Friends Meeting as Recording Clerk. Greensboro: North Carolina Yearly Meeting of Friends. p. 35pp. ISBN 0-942727-16-9.
- Morley, Barry (1993). BEYOND CONSENSUS: Salvaging Sense of the Meeting. Wallingford, PA: Pendle Hill Publications. p. 32pp. ISBN 0-87574-307-2.
- Redfern, Keith (1994). Before the Meeting: A Handbook for Clerks. London: Quaker Home Service. p. 28pp. ISBN 0-85245-256-X.
- Sharman, Cecil W (1983). Servant of the Meeting: Quaker business meetings and their Clerks. London: Quaker Home Service. p. 47pp. ISBN 0-85245-172-5.
- Watson, William Braasch (1996). Before Business Begins: Notes for Friends Meeting Recording Clerks and Recorders. Mosher Book and Tract Committee of New England Yearly Meeting. p. 59pp.
