= Friends General Conference =

North American association of Quakers

- Classification: Protestant
- Orientation: Hicksite (Liberal)
- Theology: Quaker
- General Secretary: Barry Crossno
- Distinct fellowships: Baltimore Yearly Meeting, Canadian Yearly Meeting, New England Yearly Meeting, New York Yearly Meeting, Northern Yearly Meeting, Philadelphia Yearly Meeting
- Associations: Friends World Committee for Consultation, World Council of Churches
- Region: Worldwide
- Headquarters: Philadelphia, Pennsylvania, USA
- Origin: 1900
- Congregations: 382 in US (2010)
- Members: 22,192 in US (2010); Approximately 32,000
- Official website: www.fgcquaker.org

Friends General Conference (FGC) is an association of Quakers in the United States and Canada made up of 16 yearly meetings and 12 autonomous monthly meetings. "Monthly meetings" are what Quakers call congregations; "yearly meetings" are organizations of monthly meetings within a geographic region. FGC was founded in 1900.

FGC-affiliated meetings are typically in the "unprogrammed" Quaker tradition, though there are some Friends churches with pastors. "Unprogrammed" means that worship is based on silent waiting for the Spirit's inspiration, without a pastor or a prepared order of worship. As of 2022, there are approximately 32,000 members in over 650 congregations (called meetings or churches).

Friends (Quakers) affiliated with FGC tend to be theologically liberal and more socially progressive than Friends in other branches of Quakerism in North America, though FGC welcomes Friends with diverse experiences and points of view.

FGC's programs include an annual week-long conference called "The Gathering," on-line retreats and worship opportunities, resources for meetings in becoming anti-racist spiritual communities, spiritual mentorship for youth and young adults, book publishing and sales, religious education materials, interfaith relations, and websites for meetings.

Along with the Friends United Meeting, the FGC is a member of the interdenominational World Council of Churches. The Philadelphia Yearly Meeting (PYM) is primarily affiliated with the FGC and the main offices are located in Philadelphia, Pennsylvania.

== History ==
FGC's history can be traced back to conferences held by several Quaker organizations between 1868 and 1900, including the First Day School Conference, the Friends Union for Philanthropic Labor, the Friends Religious Conference, the Friends Educational Conference, and the Young Friends Association. These groups officially joined together as Friends General Conference at Chautauqua, New York, in August 1900.

FGC has held a conference either every year or every other year, usually at a different college each time, simply called Friends General Conference (FGC). In the late 1970s in order to make a distinction between FGC as an organization and the annual conference, the conference began to be called the Gathering. In recent years, the Gathering has been held several times on the west coast rather than the East or Midwest.

== Structure and governance ==
As of May 2022, the governing body for FGC is a Central Committee made up of 111 Friends, 54 of whom are appointed by affiliated yearly and monthly meetings. It meets once a year in the fall, usually October. There is also an Executive Committee made up of officers, clerks of sub-committees, yearly meeting representatives, and at-large members which meets three times a year.

Central Committee is uniquely responsible for:

- Making final policy decisions affecting the Friends General Conference organization and program
- Approving the annual budget
- Making changes in the corporate by-laws

Executive Committee can make any decisions other than these to keep the organization functioning throughout the year.

The work of FGC is carried out by staff and several hundred volunteers. It is managed by a General Secretary (similar to an Executive Director) who provides spiritually grounded leadership, adhering to the vision statement, minute of purpose, and objectives determined by Central Committee.

In 2021, FGC had a budget of US$1.6 million and assets of US $6,241,856.

== The Gathering ==
A key program of FGC is the annual Gathering for all ages, traditionally held at a different college every July. Before the COVID-19 pandemic, the event attracted between 800 and 1,500 attenders from around the world, with most participants coming from the United States and Canada. During the height of the pandemic, 2020 through 2022, it was held virtually. Starting in 2023 a hybrid Gathering was implemented. The event features 40–60 mostly week-long workshops and a slate of both Quaker and non-Quaker plenary speakers. Dr. Martin Luther King Jr. offered a plenary presentation in 1958. In addition to workshops and plenary sessions, the Gathering features concerts for all ages. Renowned folk singer Pete Seeger performed in 1997. There are programs for children, youth, and young adults.

== See also ==
- Friends United Meeting (FUM)
- Philadelphia Yearly Meeting (PYM)
- Evangelical Friends Church International (EFCI)
- Conservative Friends
- Friends Committee on National Legislation (FCNL)
- Friends World Committee for Consultation (FWCC)
