= Epistle (Quaker) =

In the 17th century, the Quaker movement adopted the use of the word epistle following the example of its use in the New Testament. A Quaker epistle is an advisory or admonitory letter sent to a group of people; such a letter is sometimes termed a "general epistle". (Note: For examples of the titles of these 17th-century Quaker epistles, search on "epistle" in the catalogue Archived 2009-05-12 at the Wayback Machine of the Religious Society of Friends Library, London. Examples may also be found on Wikisource, including the text of a short epistle written by Isaac Penington in 1667 which is available on Wikisource.) Epistles continue to be sent by Yearly Meetings in session to all other Yearly Meetings.

== See also ==
- Book of Discipline (Quaker)
