= Meeting for Sufferings =

Quaker committee in Great Britain

Until 2026 Meeting for Sufferings was an executive committee of Britain Yearly Meeting, the body which acts on behalf of members of the Religious Society of Friends (Quakers) in Great Britain and the Crown Dependencies. It had about 200 members who meet five times a year to make decisions when the Yearly Meeting was not in session. It has been replaced with sessions of the Yearly Meeting.

== History ==
Meeting for Sufferings was originally established to assess the persecution of Friends and attempt to obtain redress. Morning Meeting, a now-obsolete body of London Quakers, agreed in October 1675 to commission certain local Friends to meet four times a year for this purpose. Their efforts were mainly directed towards the suffering of imprisoned Quakers, but they also lobbied Parliament to reduce the burden of tithes and oaths. (The refusal of Friends to take oaths, based on Jesus Christ's words "Swear not at all" (Matthew 5:33 – 37), caused great difficulties with the government and courts.) Smaller weekly meetings, which continued until 1798, helped to push this process forward.

In the eighteenth century, the Meeting began to broaden its interests, campaigning against the slave trade; a Slave Trade Committee between 1783 and 1792 helped prepare the way for the Slave Trade Act 1807. Other legislative successes included the Affirmation Acts, which allowed Quakers to avoid oath-taking; however, attempts to put forward a "Quakers Tithes Bill" were fruitless.

The beginning of the nineteenth century saw a renewed interest in contact with other Quaker groups around the world, especially in continental Europe, Calcutta, and southern Africa. Even so, Meeting for Sufferings remained a London-based body until the expansion of the railways allowed Quakers from more remote parts of the country to participate. The larger membership meant that even more subcommittees could form, covering administration, libraries, and printing; and lobbying against gambling, opium and war.

It was not until 1898 that women were allowed to join the Meeting. Although the Society of Friends was egalitarian in many other respects, the participation of women in meetings for business - as opposed to meetings for worship - had been contentious since its beginning. Founder George Fox's model was a middle way between exclusion and total inclusion: men and women were to have separate meetings for business, communicating by the passing of messages. The perceived benefit of this system was that it made it easier for wives to have different opinions from their husbands. When as in London the male membership was unusually wealthy and powerful, female interests often went unheard. (All meetings now have mixed membership.)

During the twentieth century, Meeting for Sufferings absorbed various other powerful bodies, including the old Morning Meeting in 1901. It came under the direct authority of the Yearly Meeting as part of a process of normalisation of Quaker institutions. The subcommittees of the two Meetings merged, and in 1965 Meeting for Sufferings was given the role of appointing their members. In return, it had to become more representative, drawing its membership directly from the monthly meetings (the basic unit of Quaker organisation) rather than quarterly meetings (larger assemblies of several monthly meetings).

Meeting for Sufferings is subordinate to Yearly Meeting, which ratifies its minutes and has overall constitutional authority.

== Structure ==
Most members are appointed by Yearly Meeting, based on nominations put forward by each monthly meeting or by Meeting for Suffering's own standing committees. It may also co-opt a few members on its own initiative. Members normally serve a three-year term. The table below shows the role of the relevant committees that provide members, as of 1999.

Number	Origin
170	Monthly meetings
10	Co-opted
2	Young Friends General Meeting
2	Quaker Communications Central Committee
2	Responsible for publicity, media and government liaison, and income from grants and legacies.
2	Quaker Finance and Property Central Committee
2	Financial management and planning.
2	Quaker Home Service Central Committee
2	Local and national outreach, supporting pastoral work.
2	Quaker Peace and Service Central Committee
2	Working for peace and social justice.
2	Quaker Resources for Service Central Committee
2	Administrative support, including personnel and IT services.
2	Quaker Social Responsibility and Education Central Committee
2	Advice and support for concerns (individual vocation to carry out some service) and social projects.
1	Quaker Committee for Christian and Interfaith Relations
1	Relations with non-Quaker groups.
1	Quaker World Relations Committee
1	Relations with non-British Yearly Meetings and Friends World Committee for Consultation.
Total 196, plus a clerk and assistant clerk.

Various officers of Yearly Meeting, and staff employed by Meeting for Sufferings, also attend.

== Meeting for Sufferings Committee ==
A special subcommittee recommends policies and budgets for the main Meeting, including the Yearly Meeting budget. It also carries out oversight of Meeting for Sufferings on behalf of Yearly Meeting.

It has twelve members, all drawn from Meeting for Sufferings; each year, four are replaced. No member may serve for more than two terms (six years).

== Changes in the early 21st century ==
Britain Yearly Meeting implemented a number of constitutional changes in 2006. Among these was the appointment of a small body of Trustees, who took over some of the functions of Meeting for Sufferings in January 2007.

Since this time, the work of the meeting is five-fold;

- Being a worshipping community
- Receiving information from other parts of Britain Yearly Meeting
- Making decisions
- Helping other parts of Britain Yearly Meeting
- Informing Friends about its work
