= Friends United Meeting =

International Religious Association of Quakers

- Classification: Protestant
- Orientation: Centrist (Mixed)
- Theology: Quaker and Evangelical
- Associations: National Council of Churches, World Council of Churches, Friends World Committee for Consultation
- Region: Worldwide
- Headquarters: Richmond, Indiana, USA
- Origin: 1902
- Congregations: 258 in US (2010)
- Members: 24,826 in US (2010); 170,600 Globally
- Official website: https://www.friendsunitedmeeting.org/

Friends United Meeting (FUM) is an association of twenty-six yearly meetings of the Religious Society of Friends (Quakers) in North America, Africa, and the Caribbean. Its home page states that it is "a collection of Christ-centered Quakers, embracing 34 yearly meetings and associations, thousands of local gatherings and hundreds of thousands of individuals". In addition there are several individual monthly meetings and organizations that are members of FUM; FUM's headquarters is in Richmond, Indiana, with offices in Kisumu, Kenya. Friends United Meeting is a member of the National Council of Churches in the United States of America, and is a global member of the World Council of Churches.

There are five other branches within American Quakerism, of which two are represented by similar international organizations (Friends General Conference and Evangelical Friends Church International), one is represented by a single yearly meeting (Central Yearly Meeting of Friends), and two (Conservative Friends and Beanite Quakerism) have no single unifying organization.

After the switching of around 7,000 Friends in California to the EFCI, FUM is the second largest association of Friends in the United States. As of 2010, there were 24,826 members in 258 congregations in the United States. The Friends United Meeting is responsible for much of the growth of Quakerism in Africa and Latin America. Globally, FUM has over 170,000 members, with 75 percent of the Monthly meetings being in Kenya.

FUM has meetings in the United States, Canada, Belize, Cuba, Jamaica, Kenya, Tanzania, and Uganda. FUM is also affiliated with the only Quaker meeting in Palestine, the Ramallah Friends Meeting.

== History ==
15 years after the signing on the Richmond Declaration in 1887, Five Years Meeting was established in 1902 by a collection of orthodox yearly meetings.

After World War I, growing desire for a more fundamentalist approach began to split Five Years Meeting. In 1926, Northwest Yearly Meeting withdrew from the organization, leading several other yearly meetings and scattered monthly meetings. In 1947, the Association of Evangelical Friends was formed, which led in turn to the 1965 formation of the Evangelical Friends Association, a precursor to today's Evangelical Friends International, formed in 1989.

During the 1950s many yearly meetings in North America reunited and became joint members of Five Years Meeting and Friends General Conference.

In 1963 Five Years Meeting was renamed Friends United Meeting.

== Beliefs and worship ==
There are two other similar organizations within Quakerism, Friends General Conference (FGC) and Evangelical Friends Church International (EFCI); each of these three organizations represent different branches within Quakerism, with the FGC occupying a more liberal universalist theological viewpoint and the EFCI representing an admixture of Quakerism and conservative evangelicalism.

As the largest organization of Quakers, Friends United Meeting is decidedly centrist and contains a wide range of Christian Quaker theological outlooks from very progressive and inclusive views to very conservative and traditional beliefs among individual members, Monthly Meetings or Churches, and affiliated Yearly Meetings within FUM. This has historically led to some friction within the larger organization. FUM also serves a wide range of Quaker worship styles in their Meetings for worship from unprogrammed, which is lay-led and on the basis of silence, to semi-programmed, which is pastor-led and include some elements of a traditional church service in addition to a period of open worship, to completely programmed.

Friends United Meeting considers itself to be noncreedal which allows it to embrace a wide range of Christian Quaker theological viewpoints.

Friends have no creeds—no official words can substitute for a personal relationship with God through Jesus Christ. These unofficial statements give a general sense of Friends' faith.

God is love and wants to communicate inwardly with everyone who is willing. Worship is spiritual and must be Spirit-led. All people are equal before God and may minister as they are led by God. Jesus Christ is our present Teacher and Lord, and we seek to conduct church affairs in unity under his guidance The Spirit of God gives guidance that is consistent with the Bible.

As people respond to the Light of Christ within, their lives begin to reflect Jesus' peace, integrity, simplicity and moral purity.
