= Monthly meeting =

Basic unit of administration in the Religious Society of Friends

In the Religious Society of Friends (Quakers), a monthly meeting, area meeting (UK), or regional meeting (AU) is the basic governing body, a congregation which holds regular meetings for business for Quakers in a given area. The meeting is responsible for the administration of its congregants, including membership and marriages, and for the meeting's property. A meeting can be a grouping of multiple smaller meetings, usually called preparative meetings, coming together for administrative purposes, while for others it is a single institution. In most countries, multiple monthly or area meetings form a quarterly or general meeting, which in turn form yearly meetings. Programmed Quakers may refer to their congregation as a church.

== Management ==
Among Quakers, affairs are managed at a particular kind of meeting for worship, called a meeting for business, where all members are invited to attend. Decisions are made as a form of worship, where each individual sits in contemplative silence until moved to speak on a subject. At these meetings, Quakers attempt to reach unity on a subject, in a form of religious consensus decision-making, to find "the sense of the meeting". A monthly meeting is so called because it traditionally holds these meetings once a month, separate from the normal weekly meeting for worship.

Each meeting usually nominates members to serve in certain volunteer positions to facilitate administration, including:

- a clerk and assistant clerk or clerks
- a treasurer
- a registering officer
- a nominations committee
- a body of trustees
- a custodian of records or a committee for the purpose

A monthly meeting is usually associated with a particular place of worship; in many cases, the associated meeting house has a distinctive style of architecture and interior design, to represent the Quaker testimony of Simplicity. Some meeting houses in the United States are among the earliest remaining religious structures in the country, and the oldest meeting house in America is likely the Third Haven Meeting House in Talbot County, Maryland, built between 1682 and 1684.

== See also ==
- Friends World Committee for Consultation
