= Evangelical Friends Church International =

Group of Evangelical Quaker meetings

- Classification: Protestant
- Orientation: Quaker
- Theology: Evangelical Quaker (Gurneyite)
- Associations: National Association of Evangelicals; World Evangelical Alliance
- Region: Worldwide
- Origin: 1947; 79 years ago
- Congregations: 306 in US (2010); ~2,000 Globally (2022)
- Members: 34,565 in US (2010)
- Official website: https://efc-international.org/

Evangelical Friends Church International (EFCI) is a branch of the Society of Friends (Quaker) yearly meetings (regional associations) located around the world. The EFCI is generally more conservative in their orientation than other Quaker meetings and has many similarities to other denominations of Evangelicalism. The original EFCI, known as the Association of Evangelical Friends, was formed in 1947. The EFCI adopted its current name in 2004 and is a member of the National Association of Evangelicals and the World Evangelical Alliance. The EFCI is not a member of the interdenominational Friends World Committee for Consultation. After the switching of around 7,000 Friends from the Friends United Meeting in California to the EFCI, Evangelical Friends became the largest branch of Friends in the United States.

== History ==
=== Orthodox Friends ===
The Religious Society of Friends debated a number of issues in the early 19th century that led the various Friends Meetings to develop separate fellowships. The first major division dealt with Scriptural authority, among other issues. "Orthodox Quakers" emphasized Biblical sources while "Hicksite" and his followers believed the inward light was more important than scriptural authority. The Evangelical Friends Church International grew out of the Orthodox branch that held to the primacy of scriptural authority.

=== Gurneyite Friends ===
The next major controversy led to separation in the Orthodox branch. "Gurneyite" Friends, were deeply influenced by the evangelical movement (as were other Protestant denominations of the era), especially the ideas of John Wesley. John Wilbur led a group known as "Wilburites" or "Conservative Friends", who preferred a quietist approach and disavowed Biblical inerrancy as understood by the evangelical group.

==== Ohio Yearly Meeting ====
The Ohio Yearly Meeting was originally based in Friends Meetinghouse (Mount Pleasant, Ohio). Following the separation over evangelical teachings, there were two Ohio Yearly Meetings: "Wilburite" and "Gurneyite". The current Wilburite Ohio Yearly Meeting is often distinguished by the addition of "Conservative" to its name and is a member of the Conservative Friends. The "Gurneyite" group relocated to Damascus, Ohio in 1917, becoming Ohio Yearly Meeting (Damascus). Later, they relocated again, this time to Canton, Ohio. In 1965 the Ohio Yearly Meeting (Damascus) joined the Evangelical Friends Alliance. In 1971 Ohio Yearly Meeting (Damascus) became Evangelical Friends Church – Eastern Region.

==== Five Years Meeting ====
Most of the Gurneyite Friends formed the Five Years Meeting (renamed Friends United Meeting in 1965) as an association of yearly meetings following the adoption of the Richmond Declaration in 1877. After World War I, the modernist-fundamentalist debate began to divide the Five Years Meeting. In 1926, Oregon Yearly Meeting (now Northwest Yearly Meeting) withdrew from the organization. They were joined in their departure by several other yearly meetings and scattered monthly meetings in the coming years.

=== Evangelical Friends come together ===
In 1947, the Association of Evangelical Friends was formed, with triennial meetings which lasted until 1970. In turn, this led to the formation of the Evangelical Friends Alliance (EFA) in 1965. In 1989 the EFA was superseded by the Evangelical Friends International (EFI), covering four geographic regions (Africa, Asia, Latin America, and North America). In 2007, Europe was added as a fifth region. In 2004 the name was changed to the Evangelical Friends Church, International (EFCI).

== Distinctives ==
=== The Evangelical Friends Church and other Friends ===
Friends, especially in the United States, are divided today as a result of divisions that took place mostly in the 19th century. The Evangelical branch is the one that is most similar to other evangelical Christian denominations and differs some from other branches of Quakerism. Many of the distinctives found in the EFCI originate from the Richmond Declaration of 1887.

==== LGBT issues ====
EFCI formally rejects same-sex marriage while other Friends denominations either have pro-LGBT stances (such as the Friends General Conference) or do not specify.

==== Churches ====
Evangelical Friends may refer to a local congregation as a church, while some other Friends call it a monthly meeting.

==== Programmed services ====
EFCI holds programmed (i.e. planned) services, while many other Friends hold silent services in which people speak as they feel led by God. Programmed services may incorporate silent worship, known as semi-programmed or mixed, but it is only one element in the larger service. These services are often led by an ordained (recognized) Pastor.

==== Salvation ====
A key doctrinal issue that sets Evangelical Friends apart from other Quakers is their view of salvation. Evangelical Friends believe that all people are in need of salvation, and that salvation comes to a person by putting his faith in Jesus Christ. Other Friends have a wide range of views on salvation, up to and including beliefs such as religious pluralism. Evangelical Friends support their views on the necessity of salvation as being more in line with the meaning of the Bible.

==== Biblical authority ====
Due to Evangelical Friends' origins within the Gurneyite faction during the 19th century series of schisms that divided the Society, some Evangelical Friends rely relatively less on the authority of the Inner Light and more on their belief in the authority of a literal reading of the Scripture. The Richmond Declaration states the divine inspiration of the Bible and that it is the foundation for any church doctrines. The Inner Light must be in agreement with the scriptures or else it is to be deemed as "mere delusion."

==== Allowance for water baptism and Communion ====
While many other branches of Friends do not practice water baptism and communion, the Evangelical Friends Church affirms baptism and Communion as spiritual realities, realized in Jesus Christ through the Holy Spirit. Unlike most of the other branches of Evangelicals, the Evangelical Friends Church allows for individual freedom of conscience in regards to participating in water baptism or in offering and receiving Communion within their churches.

=== The Evangelical Friends Church and other Evangelicals ===
The issue that sets Evangelical Friends apart from other evangelical Christians is that they consider themselves part of the larger Friends movement. They also feel that their particular beliefs are consistent with the beliefs of the earliest Friends, such as George Fox (other Friends assert the same about their own beliefs and practices). Evangelical Friends also generally adhere to most, if not all, of the testimonies (core beliefs and values) of Friends (see "Testimonies" under Religious Society of Friends).

== Organization ==
The Evangelical Friends Church, International is divided into several geographical areas called "Regions". Each region has its own director. A region is composed of the various Yearly Meetings and mission fields within its bounds.

=== Regions and Yearly Meetings ===
- Evangelical Friends Church / Africa
  - Rwanda Yearly Meeting
  - Burundi Yearly Meeting
  - Evangelical Congo Yearly Meeting
- Evangelical Friends Church / Asia
  - Bundelkhand Yearly Meeting (India)
  - Taiwan Yearly Meeting
  - Philippine Evangelical Friends International Ministries (Philippines)
  - Komunidad Friends Yearly Meeting (Philippines)
  - Nepal Yearly Meeting
- Evangelical Friends Church / Europe
- Evangelical Friends Church / Latin America
  - EFC-Brazil Yearly Meeting
  - Iglesia Evangélica Estrella de Belén (Bolivia)
  - Iglesia Evangélica Unión Boliviana Amigos (Bolivia)
  - Iglesia Evangélica Nacional Amigos (Guatemala)
  - Iglesia Nacional Evangélica los Amigos (Peru)
- Evangelical Friends Church / North America
  - Alaska Yearly Meeting
  - Evangelical Friends Church - Eastern Region (United States)
  - Evangelical Friends Church - Mid-America Yearly Meeting (United States)
  - Evangelical Friends Church - Southwest (United States)
  - Northwest Yearly Meeting (United States)
  - Rocky Mountain Yearly Meeting (United States)

=== Evangelical Friends Missions ===
Evangelical Friends Mission (EFM) recruits and sends missionaries to various parts of the world. It exists as the international sending agency and global church planting arm of EFCI-NA.

== Related ministries and organizations ==
=== Camps ===
- Camp Gideon, located near Salineville, Ohio
- Quaker Ridge Camp and Retreat Center located near Woodland Park, Colorado
- Twin Rocks Camp and Retreat Center, located in western Oregon
- Camp Quaker Haven located in Arkansas City, Kansas
- Quaker Hill Camp located in McCall, Idaho

=== Colleges, universities, and seminaries ===
- Azusa Pacific University
- Barclay College
- George Fox University and Portland Seminary
- Malone University
- Friends University

== Associations ==
Evangelical Friends Church International of North America is part of the National Association of Evangelicals, a large body of Christian denominations and groups in the United States that share evangelical beliefs. The EFCI globally is also a member of the World Evangelical Alliance, the largest interdenominational association in the world.

== See also ==
- Friends United Meeting
- Central Yearly Meeting of Friends
- Conservative Friends
- Friends General Conference
- Beanite Quakerism

== Statistics ==
As of 2010, the EFCI had over 34,000 members in over 300 congregations in the United States, making it the largest Quaker branch in the US, surpassing the centrist Friends United Meeting.
