= Inward light =

Quaker religious concept

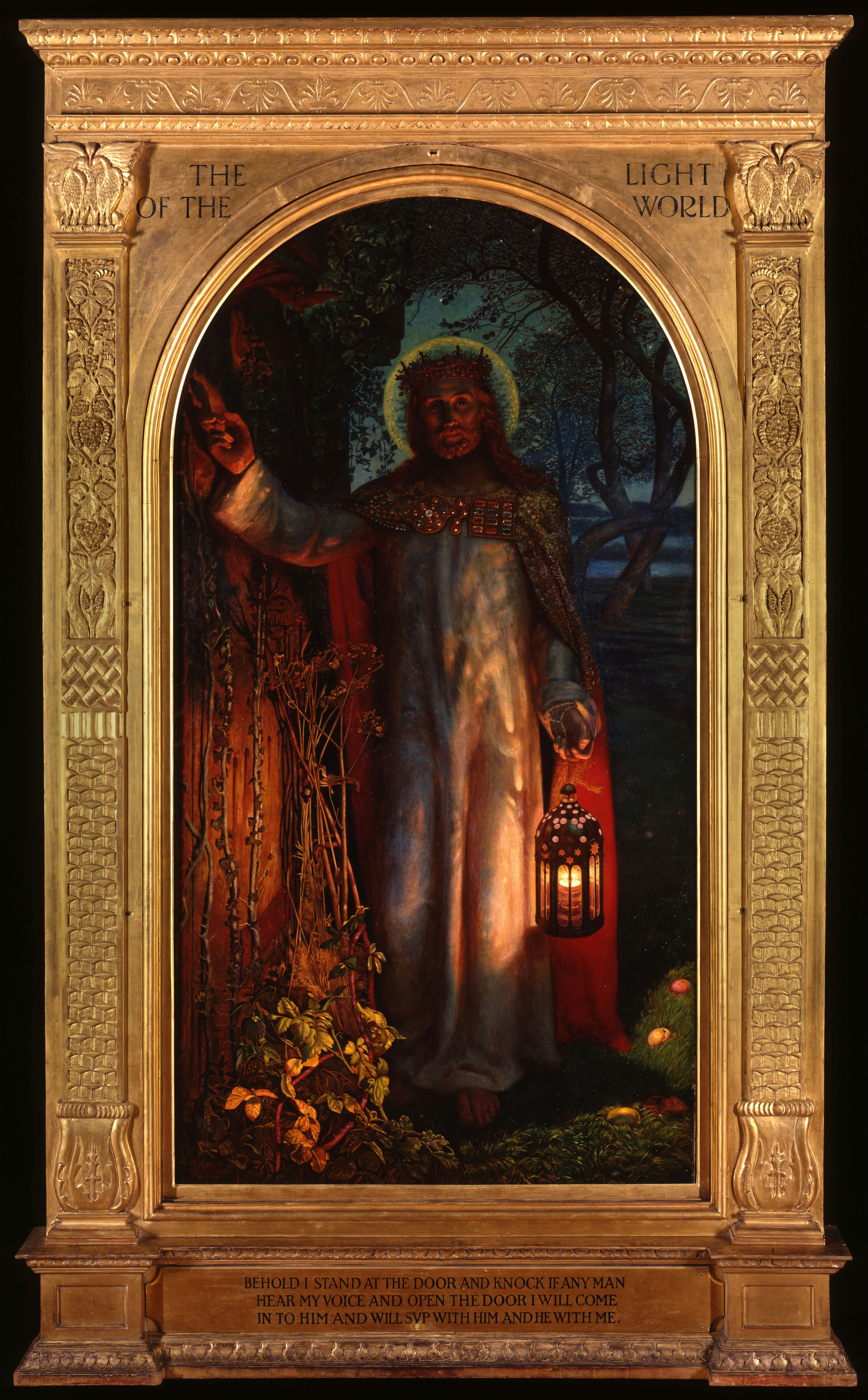
William Holman Hunt's The Light of the World, 1851–1854. The frame shows the two scripture verses which inspired the painting, John 8:12 and Revelation 3:20. Both verses were used by early Quakers to support their belief in the Light of Christ within.

Inward light, Light of God, Light of Christ, Christ within, That of God, Spirit of God within us, Light within, and inner light are related phrases commonly used within the Religious Society of Friends (Quakers) as metaphors for Christ's light shining on or in them. It was propagated by the founder of the Quaker movement, George Fox, who "preached faith in and reliance on 'inward light' (the presence of Christ in the heart)". The first Quakers were known to sit in silence and meditate on the words of the Bible until they felt the inward light of God shining upon them and the Holy Spirit speaking. The concept was highly important to early Quakers, who taught: "God reveals Himself within each individual's conscience and consciousness by the Holy Spirit, Christ Himself being the Light to illuminate man's sinfulness and lead in the way of truth and righteousness. ... this light is in all men by the grace of God to lead them to Christ, and that the same light will give daily guidance to the Christian."

The Key to the Faith and Practice of the Religious Society of Friends states that the Inward Light is "both the historical, living Jesus, and as the Grace of God extended to people that simultaneously makes us conscious of our sins, forgives them, and gives us the strength and the will to overcome them" and "teaches us the difference between right and wrong, truth and falseness, good and evil". As such, the word light is commonly used by Christians (including Quakers) as a metaphor for Christ, derived from many Biblical passages including John 8:12, which states:

I am the light of the world. Whoever follows me will never walk in darkness, but will have the light of life.

Quakers take this idea of walking in the Light of Christ to refer to God's presence within a person, and to a direct and personal experience of God, although this varies to some extent between Quakers in different yearly meetings. Quakers believe not only that individuals can be guided by this light, but that Friends might meet together and receive collective guidance from God by sharing the concerns and leadings that he gives to individuals. This is often done in meeting for worship; Pierre Lacout, a Swiss Quaker, describes a "silence which is active" causing the Inner Light to "glow", in his book God is Silence. In a Friends meeting it is usually called "ministry" when a person shares aloud what the Inward Light is saying to him or her, which is revealed "by the direct prompting of Christ through his Holy Spirit." The term inward light was first used by early Friends to refer to Christ's light shining on them; the term inner light has also been used since the twentieth century to describe this Quaker doctrine. Rufus Jones, in 1904, wrote that: "The Inner Light is the doctrine that there is something Divine, 'Something of God' in the human soul". Jones argued that his interpretation of the Quaker doctrine of the inner light was something shared by George Fox and other early Quakers, but some Quaker theologians and historians, most notably Lewis Benson reject this viewpoint. For certain Conservative Friends, Evangelical Friends and Holiness Friends, Jones' definition represents "modernistic thought" rather than early Quaker teaching, which emphasizes the necessity of a personal conversion to be a child of God."

== Related terms ==
The term "Inward light" appears in early Quaker writings. Originally, Inward Light was used much more often than "Inner Light". This term evokes an image of people being illuminated by the light of God or Christ. Although the terms are now often used interchangeably, according to Quaker historian Pink Dandelion the terms were not thought of as equivalents until Rufus Jones incorrectly used the terms as literal synonyms.

Synonyms for the Inward Light include Inner Light, Light of God, Light of Christ, Christ within, That of God, Spirit of God within us, and Light within. These are often used interchangeably by modern and arguably early Friends. Liberal Friends may identify it with the expression "that of God in everyone". Conservative Friends, Evangelical Friends and Holiness Friends identify the Inward Light as "the indwelling Holy Spirit as the Guide by whom the Scriptures are understood (I Cor. 2:10, 11) and the specific will of God for every man is made known (Rom. 8:14)." At the same time, the Bible is "the guide by which every spirit may be discerned (I Jn. 4:1-3) and every belief and practice tested (II Tim. 3:16)."

== Basis ==
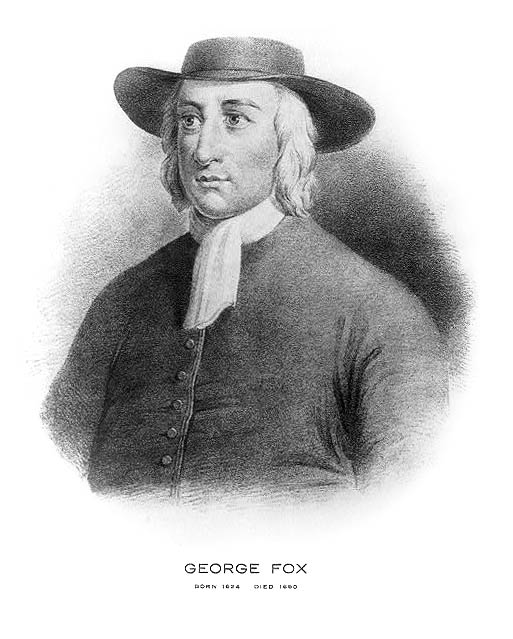
Quaker belief in the Inner Light extends back to founder George Fox.

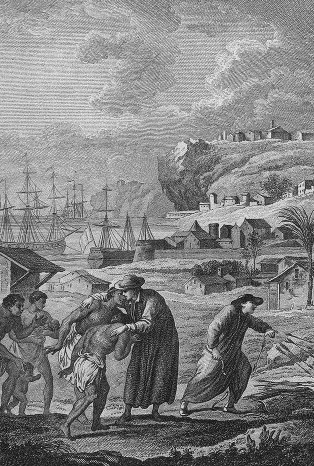
Quakers embrassant des Indiens en Pennsylvanie (Quakers embracing Indians in Pennsylvania) by Clément-Pierre Marillier, 1775

The Quaker belief that the Inward Light shines on each person is based in part on a passage from the New Testament, namely John 1:9, which says, "That was the true light, which lighteth every man that cometh into the world." Early Friends took this verse as one of their mottos and often referred to themselves as "Children of the Light". Moreover, Friends emphasize the part of the verse that indicates that the Light "is extended to all people everywhere", even "people who have never heard of Christianity in a meaningful way or at all can share in the Light, if they sincerely respond to God's grace. For when Gentiles, who do not have the law, by nature do what the law requires, they are a law to themselves, even though they do not have the law. They show that the work of the law is written on their hearts, while their conscience also bears witness, and their conflicting thoughts accuse or excuse them on the day when, according to my gospel, God judges the secrets of men by Christ Jesus (Romans 2:14–16)."

The principal founder of what became the Religious Society of Friends, George Fox, claimed that he had a direct experience of God. Having explored various sects and listened to an assortment of preachers, he finally concluded that none of them were adequate to be his ultimate guide. At that point he reported hearing a voice that told him, "There is one, even Christ Jesus, that can speak to thy condition." He felt that God wanted him to teach others that they need not depend on human teachers or guides either, because each one of them could experience God directly and hear his voice within. He wrote in his journal, "I was glad that I was commanded to turn people to that inward light, spirit, and grace, by which all might know their salvation, and their way to God; even that divine Spirit which would lead them into all Truth, and which I infallibly knew would never deceive any." Fox taught: that Christ, the Light, had come to teach his people himself; that "people had no need of any teacher but the Light that was in all men and women" (the anointing they had received); if people would be silent, waiting on God, the Light would teach them how to conduct their lives, teach them about Christ, show them the condition of their hearts; they loving the Light, it would rid them of the "cause of sin"; and soon after, Christ would return in his glory to establish his Kingdom in their hearts. Fox called the Light destroying sin within as the Cross of Christ, the Power of God.

Regarding this, Fox wrote, "Now ye that know the power of God and are come to it—which is the Cross of Christ, that crucifies you to the state that Adam and Eve were in the fall, and so to the world—by this power of God ye come to see the state they were in before they fell, which power of God is the Cross, in which stands the everlasting glory; which brings up into the righteousness, holiness and image of God, and crucifies to the unrighteousness, unholiness and image of Satan." The Cross is no "dead fact stranded on the shore of the oblivious years", but is to be a living experience deep in the heart of the believer, and changing his whole life. "You that know the power and feel the power, you feel the Cross of Christ, you feel the Gospel, which is the power of God unto salvation to every one that believeth." All real experience of the Cross must lead, he thought, to the same way of life that brought the Master there—to the way of humility and non-resistance, of overcoming evil by the sole force of love and goodness. To Fox it seemed that a high profession of Christianity often went with a way of life in flagrant opposition to this. He writes to the persecutors: "Your fruits have manifested that you are not of this (wisdom from above); and so out of the power of God which is the Cross of Christ; for you are found in the world, out of the power of God, out of the Cross of Christ, persecuting."

== Contrast with other inner sources ==
Many Friends consider this divine guidance (or "promptings" or "leadings of the Spirit") distinct both from impulses originating within oneself and from generally agreed-on moral guidelines. In fact, as Marianne McMullen pointed out, a person can be prompted to say something in meeting that is contrary to what he or she thinks. In other words, Friends do not usually consider the Inner Light the conscience or moral sensibility but something higher and deeper that informs and sometimes corrects these aspects of human nature.

== Contrast with rules and creeds ==
Historically, Friends have been suspicious of formal creeds or religious philosophy that is not grounded in one's own experience. Instead one must be guided by the Inward Teacher, the Inner Light. This is not, however, a release for Friends to decide and do whatever they want; it is incumbent upon Friends to consider the wisdom of other Friends, as one must listen for the Inner Light of others as well as their own. Friends have various established procedures for collectively discerning and following the Spirit while making decisions.

Friends procedure is to collect together their best advice in a book of "Faith and Practice", which is revised gradually over time. Many or most books of Faith and Practice contain the following, which was originally attached to a list of "Advices" published in 1656, and illustrates Friends' emphasis on the Inward Light:

Dearly beloved Friends, these things we do not lay upon you as a rule or form to walk by, but that all, with the measure of light which is pure and holy, may be guided: and so in the light walking and abiding, these may be fulfilled in the Spirit, not from the letter, for the letter killeth, but the Spirit giveth life.

== In the Bible ==
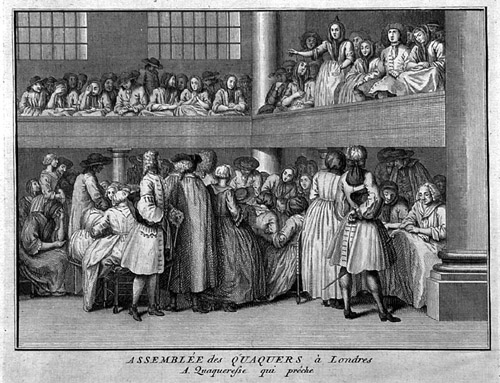
A female Quaker preaches at a meeting for worship.

Most Friends, especially in the past, have looked to the Bible as a source of doctrine, wisdom and guidance. Many, if not most of them, have considered the Bible a book inspired by God. Early Quakers, like George Fox and Robert Barclay, as well as most modern Quakers (including the Conservative Friends, Evangelical Friends, Gurneyite Friends and Holiness Friends) believed that promptings which were truly from the Holy Spirit would not contradict the Bible. They did, furthermore, believe that to correctly understand the Bible, one needed the Inward Light to clarify it and guide one in applying its teachings to current situations.

In the United States, in the nineteenth century, Friends of the Orthodox branch concluded that a minority of those of their faith, especially those of the Liberal Friends tradition, were using the concept of the Inner Light to justify unbiblical views. These Orthodox Friends held that the revelations of the Inward Light would not be in contradiction to the teachings of the Bible: "the Scriptures were foundational to Christian doctrine, and the indwelling Spirit was the immediate guide for holy living and worship." Friends remain formally, but usually respectfully, divided on the matter.

== See also ==
- Assurance (theology) – Christian doctrine on confidence in God and salvation
- Baptism with the Holy Spirit – Term found in the New Testament
- Christian contemplation – Christian mystical practices
- Christian humanism – Type of humanism
- Deus absconditus – Christian theological concept
- Examination of conscience – Concept in Catholic theology
- Human dignity – Person's right to be valued, respected and treated ethically
- Image of God – Doctrine in Judaism and Christianity
- Intercession of the Spirit
- Mental prayer – Form of Christian interior and contemplative prayer
- Namaste – Customary Hindu greeting
- Ohr – Term in the Jewish mystical tradition
- Quiet Time – Christian spiritual activity
- Testimony – Solemn attestation as to the truth of a matter
- The Light upon the Candlestick – Anonymous Christian pamphlet (1662)
