= Lewis Benson (historian) =

American quaker (1906–1986)

Lewis Benson (1906–1986) was an expert on the scripts of George Fox, the founder of the Quaker denomination of Christianity.

== Early life ==
Lewis Benson was born in 1906 in his grandmother's house in Sea Girt, New Jersey, and grew up in Weehawken, New Jersey. He was a birthright member of the Quaker Meeting at Manasquan, where his parents had been married. Most of the year, he attended a Scotch Presbyterian Church where his mother taught Sunday school. Each summer, he attended Manasquan Meeting, and he regularly attended New York Yearly Meeting and the Half Yearly Meeting that Manasquan belonged to.

At the age of 16, he dropped out of school and became a messenger boy for the Pennsylvania Railroad.

Soon after, he met George Gurdjieff, who claimed to have studied in Tibet and have secret knowledge that would allow one to influence others. Benson joined Gurdjieff's movement, but after seven years became disillusioned and left.

Benson and his mother moved to Manasquan. Borrowing money from relatives, he opened a Studebaker agency, but the business quickly failed during the Great Depression.

== Research career ==
While reading old books in the Manasquan Meeting library, Bension read the journal of George Fox which related Fox's rescue from despair through the voice of the Lord. Benson wished to find that experience for himself. He read all the Quaker classics, and began a lifelong collection of detailed notes about them.

Benson spent 1933–34 at Pendle Hill, continuing his study of the early Quakers. The following summer, he moved to Shrewsbury, New Jersey, and helped restart the Shrewsbury Monthly Meeting. He then spent a year at Woodbrooke, England, studying modern Quaker authors, and concluded that their connection with the early Quakers was weak.

Returning to the United States, Benson was invited to build up a library and be the first librarian at Pendle Hill. In the summer of 1938, Benson went to Evanston, Illinois, to become the pastoral secretary of a new meeting. He spent four years there. For the rest of his life, he worked to deepen his understanding of and share the message of George Fox. He supported his family by working as a printer.

Over the years, he spoke several times at prominent Quaker institutions such as Pendle Hill and Haverford College. His major work, Catholic Quakerism (now republished as A Universal Christian Faith), based on a series of lectures given at Woodbrooke in the 1960s, was published by Philadelphia Yearly Meeting. During the last ten years of his life, he traveled and spoke throughout Britain, Ireland, the United States, Canada, and Japan.

== Death ==
Benson died of leukemia at his home on the Jersey shore in 1986. His library and papers now reside in a special collection at Haverford College Library.

== Reaction ==
Wilmer Cooper, Founding Dean of the Earlham School of Religion, John Punshon, author of Encounter With Silence, Portrait in Grey, and Reasons for Hope, and T. Canby Jones, former Professor of Religion and Philosophy at Wilmington College have claimed to have been positively influenced by Benson.

Dean Freiday, editor of Quaker Religious Thought and author of Nothing Without Christ said, "Lewis Benson has made the major contribution in recent years toward recovery of a Christian basis that is genuinely Quaker."

The New Foundation Fellowship groups in Britain and the United States formed in the mid-1970s following lecture series of Benson's, and take their name from one of his talks. These groups have reprinted all of George Fox's published writings, have re-instituted the traveling ministry of the early Quakers, and keep many of Benson's writings in print.

== Bibliography ==
- A Universal Christian Faith
- The Quaker Vision
- George Fox's message is Relevant for Today
- Prophetic Quakerism
- The Truth is Christ: Four Essays (New Foundation Publications, No. 5)
- Strict Scholarly Experience
- Cannon Fodder
- What Did George Fox Teach About Christ?
