= New Foundation =

New Foundation may refer to:

- The New Foundation (professional wrestling), a tag team consisting of Owen Hart and Jim Neidhart
- New Foundations, an axiomatic set theory
- New Foundation Association, a Korean independence movement during the Japanese colonial period
- New Foundation Fellowship, a Christian Quaker ministry
- the New Foundation development in the Church of England; see Historical development of Church of England dioceses
