= Gurneyites =

Evangelical branch of Quakers

Gurneyites are a branch of the Religious Society of Friends, or Quakers. The name originates from sympathy with the ideas of Joseph John Gurney (1788-1847), an English Quaker minister. Gurneyites came about in the 1840s during the second schism in Quakerism. In general, Gurneyite Quakers follow evangelical Christian doctrines on Jesus Christ, the Atonement, and the Bible.

== History ==
Quakerism's first schism occurred in the 1820s & 1830s in the United States. Long Island minister Elias Hicks put forward ideas which he believed to be in line with the roots of Quakerism as found in George Fox, Isaac Penington, and others. These ideas were not universally received. Many Quakers (Friends) felt that some of Hicks' ideas were heterodox and even entered into heresy. Those who followed the ideas of Hicks were called "Hicksite" while those who opposed were deemed "Orthodox." Each side saw themselves as the true continuation of Quakerism.

In 1836, the London Yearly Meeting drafted an epistle where English Friends voiced their support for Evangelical ideas. Heavily involved in the drafting was Quaker minister Joseph John Gurney.

In the 1840s a second schism occurred among the Friends. American Quaker John Wilbur traveled to Britain and believed that Orthodox Friends had shifted too far away from their roots in response to the Hicksites. He felt that Quakerism was becoming indistinguishable from other Christian denominations. Wilbur, like Hicks before him, put more emphasis on the Quaker idea of the Inward light, which had similarities to later charismatic concepts. Those who aligned with Wilbur's ideas back in the United States became known as "Wilburites", separating from the Orthodox Friends. In response, Gurney traveled to the US and began to campaign against this new move away from Mainline Christianity.

Gurney put greater emphasis on the Bible and evangelicalism, while reducing emphasis on the Inward Light. Orthodox Friends who resisted Wilbur became known as "Gurneyites." As with the Hicksite-Orthodox division, both branches saw themselves as proper Quakerism. This schism, like the one before it, caused numerous Monthly and Yearly Meetings (associations) to split into Wilburite & Gurneyite counterparts. This major split in Quakerism continues to today, however, some meetings have partly reconciled since the 1950s.

In 1887, representatives from all Gurneyite Yearly Meetings met in Richmond, Indiana to construct a confession of faith. The result was the Richmond Declaration, which continues to be upheld as a standard of faith by most Gurneyite Friends. The declaration has much in common with other evangelical & mainline confessions. While leaving different viewpoints on Eschatology open, the declaration made a firm statement on the importance of Scripture and the structure of the church.

English Friends, who suffered no major divisions, recognized American Gurneyites as legitimate Quakers. Most Gurneyite Friends joined to form the Five Years Meeting of Friends (now Friends United Meeting) in 1902. Among Gurneyite Yearly Meetings, only Ohio Yearly Meeting declined to join. In 1924, some Friends from the Indiana Yearly Meeting and Western Yearly Meeting formed the Central Yearly Meeting of Friends due to opposition to what they perceived as modernist theology entering Earlham College. Later, other Yearly Meetings withdrew from the Five Years Meeting, with many of these Friends eventually forming what is now known as Evangelical Friends Church International (EFCI).

== Present Day ==
Gurneyite Friends are usually known as "Evangelical Friends" in the present day. The ideological descendants of the Gurneyites comprise a majority of the world's Quakers today and can be found in every inhabited continent, with most being in Africa. Most are members of the EFCI, though smaller associations of Evangelical Friends exist such as the Evangelical Friends Church Uganda Mission.

Through the EFCI, Gurneyites are in fellowship with most Evangelical Christians around the world through the National Association of Evangelicals and the World Evangelical Alliance. In an attempt to heal old wounds without compromising their confession of faith, the EFCI is in partnership with the Friends World Committee for Consultation for cooperative efforts between Gurneyites and other Friends.

The Friends United Meeting (FUM) denomination is open to and includes a range of Quaker ideas, including those of Gurneyites and Hicksites.

== Distinctives ==
While most other branches of Friends lack official creeds, Gurneyites are generally united through the Richmond Declaration of 1887.

Like most other Christians, Gurneyite congregations are usually called churches instead of meeting houses, as they are called in other Quaker branches.

Most Hicksite and Wilburite meetings consist of Unprogrammed worship, where there is no official pastor or a prepared sermon. Most Gurneyite services are similar to other evangelical services, including a pastor leading a sermon. This is not universal among Gurneyites and some meetings have "semi-programmed" worship or "mixed" which involves some unprogrammed elements.

Gurneyites generally believe that the Inward Light cannot contradict, change or add to the scriptures. Gurneyites do not hold to Christian universalism, which is found in some Hicksite circles, nor to the idea that the Inward Light can be found in the writ of other religions.
