= Great Lakes Intercollegiate Athletic Conference =

American college athletic conference

- Association: NCAA
- Founded: 1972
- Commissioner: Kris Dunbar (since 2018)
- Sports fielded: 21; men's: 10; women's: 11
- Division: Division II
- No. of teams: 11
- Headquarters: Bay City, Michigan
- Region: Great Lakes
- Website: www.gliac.org

Locations
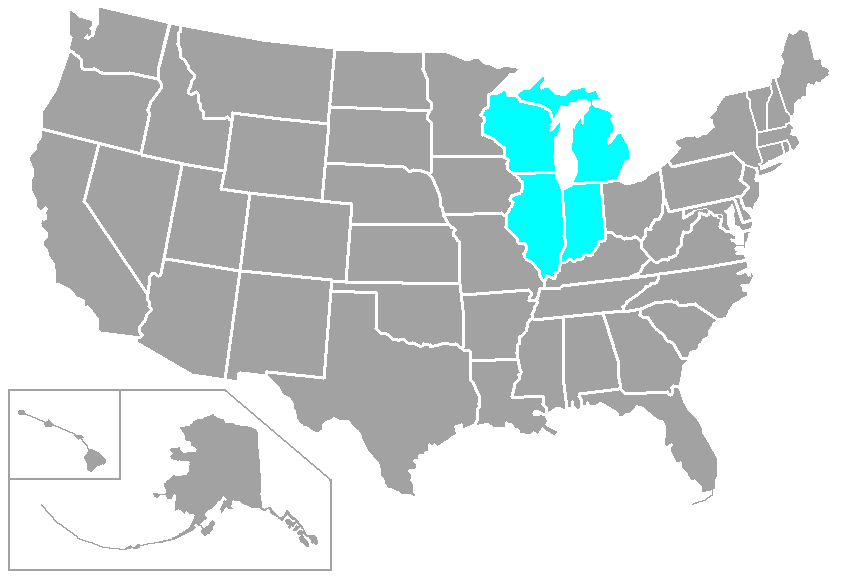

Great Lakes Intercollegiate Athletic Conference
Location of GLIAC members: full.

The Great Lakes Intercollegiate Athletic Conference (GLIAC) is a college athletic conference affiliated with the National Collegiate Athletic Association (NCAA) at the Division II level.

The GLIAC was founded in June 1972. Its eleven member institutions are located in the Midwestern United States in the states of Michigan, Illinois, Indiana, and Wisconsin. There are three affiliate members who compete in the GLIAC for sports not sponsored by their home conference.

Sponsorship of football was dropped by the GLIAC after the 1989 season. Conference schools sponsoring football joined with members of the Heartland Football Conference to form the Midwest Intercollegiate Football Conference (MIFC), which began play in 1990. The MIFC merged with the GLIAC in July 1999, and the GLIAC resumed sponsorship of football that fall.

== History ==
=== Chronological timeline ===
- 1972: The GLIAC began competition in the 1972–73 academic year. The charter members were Ferris State University, Grand Valley State University, Lake Superior State University, Northwood Institute (now Northwood University) and Saginaw Valley State University. Initially the GLIAC competed in the National Association of Intercollegiate Athletics (NAIA).
- 1974:
  - Women's programs became part of the GLIAC beginning the 1974–75 academic year.
  - Oakland University joined the GLIAC in the 1974–75 academic year.
- 1975: Hillsdale College, Northern Michigan University and Wayne State University joined the GLIAC in the 1975–1976 academic year. Northern Michigan continued to play football as an NCAA D-II independent.
- 1977: Northern Michigan left the GLIAC after the 1976–77 academic year.
- 1980: Michigan Technological University (Michigan Tech) joined the GLIAC in the 1980–81 academic year.
- 1986: Michigan Tech left GLIAC football in the 1986–87 academic year, but remained in the conference in other sports.
- 1987:
  - Northwood left the GLIAC after the 1986–87 academic year.
  - Northern Michigan rejoined the GLIAC in the 1987–88 academic year.
- 1990: The GLIAC dropped football as a sponsored sport after the 1989 fall season (1989–90 academic year).
- 1992: Northwood rejoined the GLIAC in the 1992–93 academic year.
- 1994: On December 14, 1994, Ashland University, Gannon University and Mercyhurst College (now Mercyhurst University) joined the GLIAC, all effective beginning the 1995–1996 academic year.
- 1997:
  - Oakland left the GLIAC to become an NCAA D-I Independent after the 1996–97 academic year. (which would later joined the Mid-Continent Conference (now the Summit League), beginning the 1998–99 school year).
  - The University of Findlay joined the GLIAC in the 1997–98 academic year.
- 1999: The GLIAC reinstated football as a sponsored sport by merging with the Midwest Intercollegiate Football Conference (MIFC). The only non-GLIAC member of the MIFC, the University of Indianapolis (UIndy) became a football-only affiliate of the GLIAC, all effective in the 1999 fall season (1999–00 academic year).
- 2001: Indianapolis (UIndy) added men's and women's swimming & diving to its GLIAC affiliate membership in the 2001–02 academic year.
- 2004: Lewis University joined the GLIAC as an affiliate member for men's and women's swimming and diving in the 2004–05 academic year.
- 2007: On June 20, 2007, Tiffin University joined the GLIAC, effective beginning the 2008–09 academic year.
- 2008: Gannon and Mercyhurst left the GLIAC to join the Pennsylvania State Athletic Conference (PSAC) after the 2007–08 academic year.
- 2010: Lake Erie College and Ohio Dominican University joined the GLIAC in the 2010–11 academic year.
- 2012:
  - Malone University and Walsh University joined the GLIAC in the 2012–13 academic year.
  - Four institutions joined the GLIAC as affiliate members, all effective in the 2012–13 academic year:
    - Notre Dame College for football, women's lacrosse, men's and women's soccer, and wrestling
    - and Alderson Broaddus University, Urbana University and Wheeling Jesuit University (now Wheeling University) for women's lacrosse
- 2013:
  - Notre Dame (Oh.) left the GLIAC as an affiliate member to move its sports into its new primary conference home in the Mountain East Conference (MEC) after the 2012–13 academic year.
  - UIndy and Lewis left the GLIAC as affiliate members for men's and women's swimming & diving after the 2012–13 academic year.
  - Ursuline College joined the GLIAC as an affiliate member for women's lacrosse and women's swimming & diving in the 2012–13 academic year.
- 2014:
  - Urbana and Wheeling Jesuit left the GLIAC as affiliate members for women's lacrosse after the 2014 spring season (2013–14 academic year).
  - McKendree University joined the GLIAC as an affiliate member for women's lacrosse in the 2015 spring season (2014–15 academic year).
- 2015:
  - Alderson Broaddus and Ursuline left the GLIAC as affiliate members for women's lacrosse after the 2015 spring season (2014–15 academic year).
  - UIndy rejoined the GLIAC as an affiliate member in women's lacrosse in the 2016 spring season (2015–16 academic year).
- 2016:
  - Malone left the GLIAC to join the Great Midwest Athletic Conference (G-MAC) after the 2015–16 academic year.
  - Ursuline left the GLIAC as an affiliate member for women's swimming & diving after the 2015–16 academic year.
- 2017:
  - Findlay, Hillsdale, Lake Erie, Ohio Dominican and Walsh left the GLIAC to join the G-MAC after the 2016–17 academic year.
  - Davenport University and Purdue University–Northwest joined the GLIAC in the 2017–18 academic year.
  - Concordia University, St. Paul joined the GLIAC as an affiliate member for women's lacrosse in the 2018 spring season (2017–18 academic year).
- 2018:
  - Tiffin left the GLIAC to join the G-MAC after the 2017–18 academic year.
  - The University of Wisconsin–Parkside joined the GLIAC in the 2018–19 academic year. It also adopted the new athletic brand name of Parkside.
  - Three institutions joined the GLIAC as affiliate members (and/or added other single sports into their affiliate memberships), all effective in the 2018–19 academic year:
    - Lewis and Maryville University for women's lacrosse
    - and St. Cloud State University for men's swimming & diving
- 2019:
  - UIndy, Lewis, Maryville and McKendree left the GLIAC as affiliate members for women's lacrosse after the 2019 spring season (2018–19 academic year).
  - Upper Iowa University joined the GLIAC as an affiliate member for men's soccer and women's lacrosse in the 2019–20 academic year.
- 2021:
  - Ashland left the GLIAC to join the G-MAC after the 2020–21 academic year.
  - Augustana University joined the GLIAC as an affiliate member for men's swimming & diving in the 2021–22 academic year.
  - St. Cloud State added men's soccer to its GLIAC affiliate membership in the 2021 fall season (2021–22 academic year).
- 2022:
  - Northwood left the GLIAC for a second time to join the G-MAC after the 2021–22 academic year.
- 2023:
  - Roosevelt University joined the GLIAC in the 2023–24 academic year. Although Roosevelt would initially join the conference as a provisional member, it kept continuing to compete in the National Association of Intercollegiate Athletics (NAIA) and the Chicagoland Collegiate Athletic Conference (CCAC) in 2023–24 before beginning competition as a full GLIAC member in July 2024.
  - Upper Iowa announces its intent to move to the Great Lakes Valley Conference (GLVC) in all sports after the 2022–23 academic year, including its GLIAC affiliated sports of women's lacrosse and men's soccer.
- 2026:
  - The GLIAC begins sponsoring women's flag football in the sport's first full year in the NCAA Emerging Sports for Women program.

== Member schools ==
=== Current members ===
The GLIAC currently has 11 full members; all but two are public schools.

Institution	Location	Founded	Affiliation	Enrollment	Nickname	Joined (Note: Represents the calendar year when fall sports competition begins.)	Colors
Davenport University	Grand Rapids, Michigan	1866	Nonsectarian	4,848	Panthers	2017	
Ferris State University	Big Rapids, Michigan	1884	Public	9,959	Bulldogs	1972	
Grand Valley State University	Allendale, Michigan	1960	Public	22,011	Lakers	1972	
Lake Superior State University	Sault Ste. Marie, Michigan	1946	Public	1,669	Lakers	1972	
Michigan Technological University	Houghton, Michigan	1885	Public	7,430	Huskies	1980	
Northern Michigan University	Marquette, Michigan	1899	Public	6,958	Wildcats	1975; 1987 (Note: Northern Michigan left the GLIAC after the 1976–77 school year; which would later re-join back in the 1987–88 school year.)	
Purdue University Northwest	Hammond and Westville, Indiana (Note: Purdue Northwest maintains a branch campus in Westville, where the men's and women's cross country teams are housed and where the men's and women's basketball & women's volleyball teams play a portion of their home contests; the other intercollegiate athletics teams compete on the main campus in Hammond.)	1946 (Note: Purdue Northwest was originally founded as two separate institutions: Purdue University–Calumet in Hammond and Purdue University–North Central in Westville, which both began offering degrees in 1946. The two institutions were merged to become Purdue Northwest in 2016.)	Public	9,051	Lions	2017	
Roosevelt University	Chicago, Illinois	1945	Nonsectarian	4,281	Lakers	2023 (Note: Roosevelt joined the GLIAC as a provisional member in July 2023 while still competing in the NAIA's Chicagoland Collegiate Athletic Conference (CCAC); it began competition as a full GLIAC member since fall 2024.)	
Saginaw Valley State University	University Center, Michigan	1963	Public	6,822	Cardinals	1972	
Wayne State University	Detroit, Michigan	1868	Public	23,553	Warriors	1975	
University of Wisconsin–Parkside	Somers, Wisconsin	1968	Public	3,947	Rangers	2018	

=== Affiliate members ===
The GLIAC currently has four affiliate members; all but one are private schools.

Institution	Location	Founded	Affiliation	Enrollment	Nickname	Joined (Note: Represents the calendar year when fall sports competition begins.)	Colors	GLIAC sport(s)	Primary conference
Augustana University	Sioux Falls, South Dakota	1860	Lutheran ELCA	2,158	Vikings	2021		men's swimming & diving	Northern Sun (NSIC)
Concordia University–St. Paul	Saint Paul, Minnesota	1893	Lutheran LCMS	5,928	Golden Bears	2017		women's lacrosse	Northern Sun (NSIC)
Lewis University	Romeoville, Illinois	1932	Catholic	7,011	Flyers	2026 (Note: Lewis previously joined the conference as an affiliate member in 2004 (men's and women's swimming) and 2018 (women's lacrosse).)		women's flag football	Great Lakes Valley (GLVC)
St. Cloud State University	St. Cloud, Minnesota	1869	Public	10,164	Huskies	2018		men's swimming & diving	Northern Sun (NSIC)
St. Cloud State University	St. Cloud, Minnesota	1869	Public	10,164	Huskies	2021		men's soccer	Northern Sun (NSIC)

=== Future affiliate members ===
Institution	Location	Founded	Affiliation	Enrollment	Nickname	Joining (Note: Represents the calendar year when fall sports competition begins.)	Colors	GLIAC sport	Current conference
University of Illinois Springfield	Springfield, Illinois	1969	Public	4,367	Prairie Stars	2027		women's flag football	Great Lakes Valley (GLVC)

=== Former members ===
The GLIAC had 13 former full members; all but one are private schools:

Institution	Location	Founded	Affiliation	Enrollment	Nickname	Joined (Note: Represents the calendar year when fall sports competition begins.)	Left (Note: Represents the calendar year when spring sports competition ends.)	Current conference
Ashland University	Ashland, Ohio	1878	Brethren	6,626	Eagles	1995	2021	Great Midwest (G-MAC)
University of Findlay	Findlay, Ohio	1882	Churches of God	4,870	Oilers	1997	2017	Great Midwest (G-MAC)
Gannon University	Erie, Pennsylvania	1925	Catholic	4,238	Golden Knights	1995	2008	Pennsylvania (PSAC)
Hillsdale College	Hillsdale, Michigan	1844	Nonsectarian	1,521	Chargers	1975	2017	Great Midwest (G-MAC)
Lake Erie College	Painesville, Ohio	1856	Nonsectarian	1,177	Storm	2010	2017	Great Midwest (G-MAC)
Malone University	Canton, Ohio	1892	Evangelical	1,684	Pioneers	2012	2016	Great Midwest (G-MAC)
Mercyhurst University	Erie, Pennsylvania	1926	Catholic	3,217	Lakers	1995	2008	Northeast (NEC) (Note: Currently an NCAA Division I athletic conference.)
Northwood University	Midland, Michigan	1959	Nonsectarian	2,541	Timberwolves	1972; 1992	1987; 2022	Great Midwest (G-MAC)
Oakland University	Rochester, Michigan (Note: The Oakland campus has a Rochester mailing address, but lies within the separate cities of Auburn Hills and Rochester Hills.)	1957	Public	20,519	Golden Grizzlies	1974	1997	Horizon
Ohio Dominican University	Columbus, Ohio	1911	Catholic	1,716	Panthers	2010	2017	Great Midwest (G-MAC)
Tiffin University	Tiffin, Ohio	1888	Nonsectarian	3,096	Dragons	2008	2018	Great Midwest (G-MAC)
Walsh University	North Canton, Ohio	1960	Catholic	2,779	Cavaliers	2012	2017	Great Midwest (G-MAC)
Westminster College	New Wilmington, Pennsylvania	1852	Presbyterian	1,482	Titans	1997	2000	Presidents' (PAC) (Note: Currently an NCAA Division III athletic conference.)

=== Former affiliate members ===
The GLIAC had nine former affiliate members, all were private schools. School names and nicknames reflect those in use in the final season each school was an affiliate:

Institution	Location	Founded	Affiliation	Enrollment	Nickname	Joined (Note: Represents the calendar year when fall sports competition begins.)	Left (Note: Represents the calendar year when spring sports competition ends.)	GLIAC sport(s)	Primary conference
Alderson Broaddus University	Philippi, West Virginia	1871	Baptist	2,306	Battlers	2012	2015	women's lacrosse	Closed in 2023
University of Indianapolis	Indianapolis, Indiana	1902	United Methodist	4,168	Greyhounds	1999^{fb.}; 2015^{w.lax.}; 2000^{m.sw.}; 2000^{w.sw.}	2012^{fb.}; 2019^{w.lax.}; 2013^{m.sw.}; 2013^{w.sw.}	football; women's lacrosse; men's swimming & diving; women's swimming & diving	Great Lakes Valley (GLVC)
Lewis University	Romeoville, Illinois	1932	Catholic	4,306	Flyers	2018^{w.lax.} 2004^{m.sw.} 2004^{w.sw.}	2019^{w.lax.} 2013^{m.sw.} 2013^{w.sw.}	women's lacrosse; men's swimming & diving; women's swimming & diving	Great Lakes Valley (GLVC)
Maryville University	Town and Country, Missouri (Note: The main campus is located in Town and Country but has a St. Louis mailing address.)	1872	Catholic	5,504	Saints	2018	2019	women's lacrosse	Great Lakes Valley (GLVC)
McKendree University	Lebanon, Illinois	1828	United Methodist	1,702	Bearcats	2014	2019	women's lacrosse	Great Lakes Valley (GLVC)
Notre Dame College	South Euclid, Ohio	1922	Catholic	2,200	Falcons	2012^{fb.}; 2012^{w.lax.}; 2012^{m.soc.}; 2012^{w.soc.}; 2012^{wr.}	2013^{fb.}; 2013^{w.lax.}; 2013^{m.soc.}; 2013^{w.soc.}; 2013^{wr.}	football; women's lacrosse; men's soccer; women's soccer; wrestling	Closed in 2024
Upper Iowa University	Fayette, Iowa	1857	Nonsectarian	N/A	Peacocks	2019^{w.lax.}; 2019^{m.soc.}	2022^{w.lax.}; 2023^{m.soc.}	women's lacrosse; men's soccer	Great Lakes Valley (GLVC)
Urbana University	Urbana, Ohio	1850	Nonsectarian	N/A	Blue Knights	2012	2014	women's lacrosse	Closed in 2020
Ursuline College	Pepper Pike, Ohio	1850	Catholic	1,073	Arrows	2013^{w.lax.}; 2013^{w.sw.}	2015^{w.lax.}; 2016^{w.sw.}	women's lacrosse; women's swimming & diving	Great Midwest (G-MAC)
Wheeling Jesuit University (Note: Currently known as Wheeling University since 2019.)	Wheeling, West Virginia	1954	Catholic	1,600	Cardinals	2012	2014	women's lacrosse	Mountain East (MEC)

=== Membership timeline ===
Note: The GLIAC dropped football after the 1989 fall season (1989–90 school year) and resumed it since the 1999 fall season (1999–2000 school year).

Full member (all sports) Full member (non-football) Associate member (football) Associate member (sport)

== Sports ==
The GLIAC sponsors the following 21 sports: Women's flag football will be added in 2026–27.

Conference sports
Sport	Men's	Women's
Baseball	✓	
Basketball	✓	✓
Cross Country	✓	✓
Flag football		✓
Football	✓	
Golf	✓	✓
Lacrosse		✓
Soccer	✓	✓
Softball		✓
Swimming & Diving	✓	✓
Tennis	✓	✓
Track & Field Indoor	✓	✓
Track & Field Outdoor	✓	✓
Volleyball		✓

=== Men's sponsored sports by school ===
School	Baseball	Basketball	Cross Country	Football	Golf	Soccer	Swimming & Diving	Tennis	Track & Field Indoor	Track & Field Outdoor	Total GLIAC Sports
Davenport	✓	✓	✓	✓	✓	✓	✓	✓	✓	✓	10
Ferris State		✓	✓	✓	✓			✓	✓	✓	7
Grand Valley State	✓	✓	✓	✓	✓		✓	✓	✓	✓	9
Lake Superior State		✓	✓		✓		✓	✓	✓	✓	7
Michigan Tech		✓	✓	✓				✓		✓	5
Northern Michigan		✓		✓	✓	✓	✓				5
Parkside	✓	✓	✓		✓	✓			✓	✓	7
Purdue Northwest	✓	✓	✓		✓	✓		✓	✓	✓	8
Roosevelt	✓	✓	✓	✓	✓	✓		✓	✓	✓	9
Saginaw Valley State	✓	✓	✓	✓	✓	✓	✓		✓	✓	9
Wayne State	✓	✓	✓	✓	✓		✓	✓			7
Totals	7	11	10	8	10	6+1	6+2	8	8	9	83
Affiliate Members
Augustana							✓				1
St. Cloud State						✓	✓				2

=== Women's sponsored sports by school ===
School	Basketball	Cross Country	Flag football (Note: Currently part of the NCAA Emerging Sports for Women program; expected to become an official NCAA championship sport in 2027–28.)	Golf	Lacrosse	Soccer	Softball	Swimming & Diving	Tennis	Track & field Indoor	Track & field Outdoor	Volleyball	Total GLIAC Sports
Davenport	✓	✓	✓	✓	✓	✓	✓	✓	✓	✓	✓	✓	12
Ferris State	✓	✓		✓		✓	✓		✓	✓	✓	✓	9
Grand Valley State	✓	✓		✓	✓	✓	✓	✓	✓	✓	✓	✓	11
Lake Superior State	✓	✓		✓				✓	✓	✓	✓	✓	7
Michigan Tech	✓	✓				✓			✓		✓	✓	6
Northern Michigan	✓	✓		✓	✓	✓		✓		✓	✓	✓	9
Parkside	✓	✓	✓			✓	✓			✓	✓	✓	8
Purdue Northwest	✓	✓	✓	✓		✓	✓		✓	✓	✓	✓	10
Roosevelt	✓	✓				✓	✓		✓	✓	✓	✓	8
Saginaw Valley State	✓	✓	✓	✓	✓	✓	✓	✓	✓	✓	✓	✓	12
Wayne State	✓	✓		✓		✓	✓	✓	✓	✓	✓	✓	11
Totals	12	12	4+1	8	4+1	10	8	5	9	10	11	11	104
Affiliate Members
Concordia–St. Paul					✓								1
Illinois–Springfield			✓ (Note: Adding for the 2027-28 season.)										
Lewis			✓										

=== Other sponsored sports by school ===
School	Men					Women			Co-ed
School	Fencing (Note: De facto Division I sport. The NCAA holds single championship meets open to members of all divisions in men's and women's fencing and the coeducational sport of skiing. The women's wrestling championship is also open to all divisions through 2026–27, after which a separate Division III championship will be established. In men's ice hockey, the NCAA Division I championship is open to Division II members. Men's volleyball has the same structure, except that sport's championship is styled as a "National Collegiate" championship instead of a "Division I" championship.)	Ice Hockey	Lacrosse	Volleyball	Wrestling	Fencing	Stunt (Note: Graduated from the NCAA Emerging Sports for Women program in January 2026 to become a de facto Division I sport. The first NCAA championship, a single all-divisions event, takes place in 2026–27.)	Wrestling	Skiing
Davenport			G-MAC		G-MAC		G-MAC	GLVC	
Ferris State		CCHA					GLVC		
Grand Valley State					GLVC			GLVC	
Lake Superior State		CCHA							
Michigan Tech		CCHA							CCSA
Northern Michigan		CCHA			(Note: Northern Michigan houses an official U.S. Olympic training center for the non-NCAA discipline of Greco-Roman wrestling. All trainees are enrolled at NMU, and are recognized as NMU varsity athletes.)			GLVC	CCSA (Note: Northern Michigan only competes in NCAA-sponsored events in Nordic skiing. Its Alpine skiing squad is recognized as a varsity team, but does not compete in NCAA events.)
Parkside					NSIC				
Purdue Northwest							GLVC		
Roosevelt				GLVC					
Wayne State	CCFC					CCFC			

Notes

In addition to the above:

- Davenport has varsity teams in esports (coeducational) as well as men's and women's ultimate.
- Michigan Tech and Purdue Northwest have coeducational varsity esports teams.
- Northern Michigan recognizes esports (fully coeducational) as a varsity sport. Also, the university hosts an official U.S. Olympic training center for men's and women's weightlifting; all participants in this program are enrolled at NMU, and are recognized as varsity athletes.
- Roosevelt recognizes ACHA (club) D1 and D2 men's hockey as well as ACHA women's hockey within its athletic department.

== National Championships ==
GLIAC schools have won 58 NCAA National Championships:

Year	Sport	School
1975	Football	Northern Michigan
1980	Men's swimming & diving	Oakland
1990	Women's swimming & diving	Oakland
1991	Women's swimming & diving	Oakland
1992	Women's swimming & diving	Oakland
1993	Women's swimming & diving	Oakland
1993	Women's volleyball	Northern Michigan
1994	Men's swimming & diving	Oakland
1994	Women's swimming & diving	Oakland
1994	Women's volleyball	Northern Michigan
1995	Men's swimming & diving	Oakland
1996	Men's swimming & diving	Oakland
1997	Men's swimming & diving	Oakland
2002	Football	Grand Valley State
2003	Football	Grand Valley State
2005	Football	Grand Valley State
2005	Women's volleyball	Grand Valley State
2006	Women's basketball	Grand Valley State
2006	Football	Grand Valley State
2009	Men's basketball	Findlay
2009	Women's soccer	Grand Valley State
2010	Women's cross country	Grand Valley State
2010	Women's soccer	Grand Valley State
2011	Women's track & field (I)	Grand Valley State
2011	Women's track & field (O)	Grand Valley State
2012	Women's cross country	Grand Valley State
2012	Women's swimming & diving	Wayne State (MI)
2012	Women's track & field (I)	Grand Valley State
2012	Women's track & field (O)	Grand Valley State
2013	Women's basketball	Ashland
2013	Women's cross country	Grand Valley State
2013	Women's soccer	Grand Valley State
2014	Women's cross country	Grand Valley State
2014	Women's soccer	Grand Valley State
2015	Women's soccer	Grand Valley State
2016	Women's cross country	Grand Valley State
2016	Men's track & field (I)	Tiffin
2017	Women's basketball	Ashland
2017	Men's track & field (I)	Tiffin
2018	Men's basketball	Ferris State
2018	Men's cross country	Grand Valley State
2018	Women's cross country	Grand Valley State
2019	Men's track & field (I)	Ashland
2019	Men's track & field (O)	Ashland
2019	Women's soccer	Grand Valley State
2021	Women's track & field (O)	Grand Valley State
2021	Men's cross country	Grand Valley State
2021	Women's soccer	Grand Valley State
2021	Football	Ferris State
2022	Men's track & field (I)	Grand Valley State
2022	Football	Ferris State
2024	Football	Ferris State
2025	Women's track & field (O)	Grand Valley State
2025	Women's basketball	Grand Valley State
2025	Women's cross country	Grand Valley State
2025	Football	Ferris State
2026	Women's basketball	Grand Valley State
2026	Men's track & field (O)	Grand Valley State

== Conference facilities ==
School	Football		Basketball	
School	Stadium	Capacity	Arena	Capacity
Davenport	Meyering Field	2,300	Davenport Student Center	1,500
Ferris State	Top Taggart Field	6,200	Jim Wink Arena	2,400
Grand Valley State	Lubbers Stadium	10,444	GVSU Fieldhouse	4,200
Lake Superior State	non-football school		Ronald "Bud" Cooper Gymnasium	2,500
Michigan Tech	Sherman Field	3,000	SDC Gymnasium	3,200
Northern Michigan	Superior Dome	8,000	Vandament Arena	3,000
Parkside	non-football school		DeSimone Gymnasium	2,120
Purdue Northwest	non-football school		John Friend Court; H.D. Kesling Gymnasium	— 1,500
Roosevelt	Morris Field		Goodman Center	500
Saginaw Valley State	Wickes Memorial Stadium	6,300	James E. O'Neill Jr. Arena	3,500
Wayne State	Adams Field	6,000	Wayne State Fieldhouse	3,000
