= Evangelical Friends Church – Eastern Region =

North American Christian denomination

- Classification: Protestant
- Orientation: Quaker
- Theology: Evangelical (Gurneyite)
- Distinct fellowships: Evangelical Friends Church International
- Associations: Malone University, Friends Mission
- Region: US and Canada
- Congregations: 95
- Official website: https://www.efcer.org/

The Evangelical Friends Church – Eastern Region (EFCER) is an evangelical denomination of Christians who trace their beginning back to George Fox and the Religious Society of Friends. Based in Canton, Ohio, it is composed of 95 churches and church plants, and is part of Evangelical Friends Church International (EFCI). Near to the church's administrative offices is the campus of the affiliated Malone University. The EFCER was previously called the "Ohio Yearly Meeting" (OYM) and should not be confused with the Ohio Yearly Meeting of the Conservative Friends which has kept the name and OYM abbreviation.

== History ==
The Ohio Yearly Meeting of the Friends Church (OYM) was established on October 12, 1812, by the Baltimore Yearly Meeting of the Religious Society of Friends. At the time the Ohio Yearly Meeting included most of the Friends meetings West of the Allegheny Mountains. The first OYM yearly meeting was on August 14, 1813 at Short Creek, with Horton Howard presiding. The first Yearly Meeting House was erected in 1814 in Mt. Pleasant, Ohio. Many new local "meeting houses" followed.

Evangelical Friends Headquarters in Canton, Ohio

During the 1800s the Friends movement experienced a separation over theology that would today be characterized as a debate between Unitarian/Universalism and Orthodoxy (Hicksites & Orthodox Meetings). Later the Society of Friends again wrestled over traditional Friends practices and Evangelicalism (Wilburite and Gurneyite Meetings). These separations resulted in multiple groups using the name "Ohio Yearly Meeting".

In 1917 the evangelicals (Gurneyites) moved their headquarters to Damascus, Ohio, and became known as the Ohio Yearly Meeting (Damascus). The Yearly Meeting House in Damascus was used from 1866 until a few years before it was razed in the 1970s. Later, they relocated again, this time to Canton, Ohio. In 1965 the Ohio Yearly Meeting (Damascus) joined the Evangelical Friends Alliance. In 1971 Ohio Yearly Meeting (Damascus) became Evangelical Friends Church – Eastern Region (EFCER).

=== Baptism and communion ===
By the 1870s, a noted evangelist, David B. Updegraff, supported baptism and communion in Friends churches. His teachings were considered a near-scandal in Friends meetings throughout the world, and resulted in some yearly meetings agreeing to allow for freedom of conscience in those practices. Updegraff largely solidified the EFCER's participation in the Evangelical-Holiness camp.

=== Malone University ===
The Evangelical Friends Church - Eastern Region was heavily influenced by the leadership of J. Walter and Emma Malone. In 1892, they founded the Cleveland Bible Training Institute—now Malone University in Canton—to train pastors and missionaries. Walter became the first General Superintendent in 1889, although the title was not formalized until 1891. The first missionaries to come out of the school were Esther Baird and Delia Fistler, who served in India. In fact, the school (either officially or through its graduates) helped to sponsor eight other schools of higher education around the country and around the world.

=== Twentieth century ===
Into the twentieth century, EFCER expanded its churches, missions, leaders and prominence amongst evangelicals worldwide. Leaders and members of note include Everett L. Cattell (pastor, missionary, author, and college president), Walter Williams (pastor, missionary, and superintendent), Cliff Robinson (missionary, one-time song leader for Billy Graham and founder of the Presidential Prayer Breakfasts), and Charles DeVol (renowned botanist and missionary).

=== Today ===
The current mission of EFCER is to equip churches to make disciples.

== Current leadership ==
- Executive Director: Pastor Edward Walsh
- Director of Leadership Development: Pastor David Mercadante
- Director of Finance and Administration: Pastor Andy Black
- Director of Multiplication: Pastor Matt Chesnes
- Coordinator of Hispanic Ministries: Pastor Samuel Navarro
- Church Connections: Pastor Bruce Bell
