= South China Meeting House =

Historic church in Maine, United States

- U.S. National Register of Historic Places
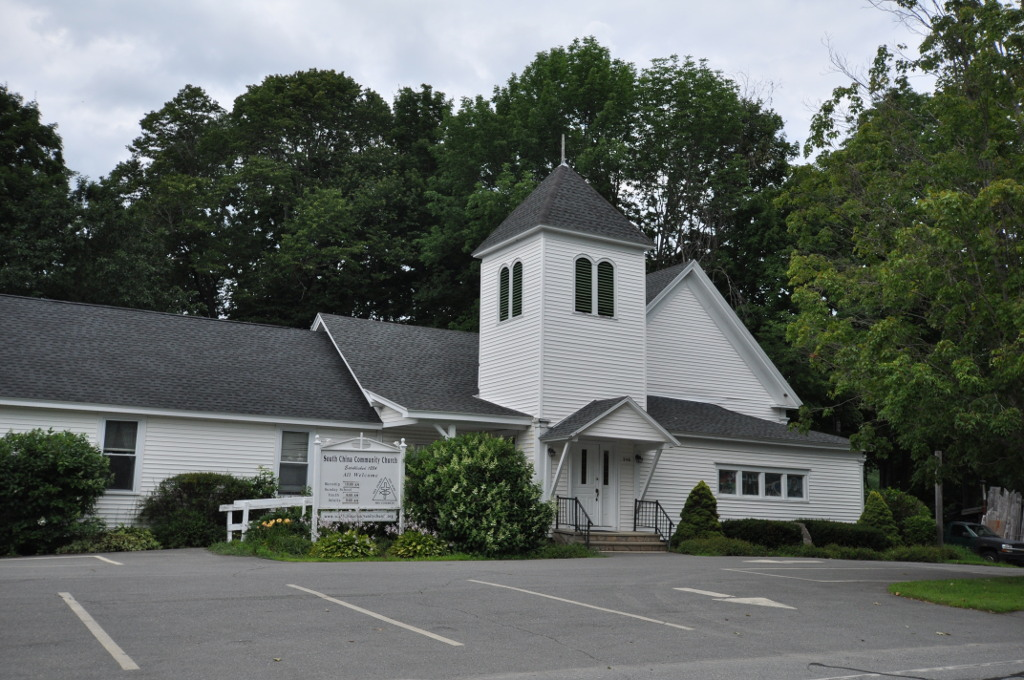

- Location within Maine Location within the United States
- Location: Village St., China, Maine
- Coordinates: 44°23′45″N 69°34′27″W
- Area: 0.3 acres (0.12 ha)
- Built: 1884
- Architectural style: Queen Anne
- MPS: Rufus Jones TR
- NRHP reference No.: 83000459
- Added to NRHP: August 04, 1983

The South China Meeting House, now known as the South China Community Church, is a historic church on Village Street in South China, Maine. Built in 1884 as a Quaker meeting house, it is now home to multi-denominational congregation. It is notable as one of the places that influenced Quaker writer Rufus Jones, who was raised in South China and attended services here after this building replaced the Pond Meeting House. It was listed on the National Register of Historic Places in 1983.

== Description and history ==
The South China Community Church is located in the center of South China village, on the north side of Village Street. It is a rambling single-story structure, whose most prominent feature is a square tower that has a louvered belfry and pyramidal top. To the right of the tower, a low shed-hip-roof section fronts a taller section with a front-facing gable. This tall section is the original sanctuary. To the left of the tower is a short-gable section, which gives way to a longer gabled section with a lower roof. The main entrance is at the base of the tower, sheltered by a gabled hood, with secondary entrances immediately to its left (under a shed-roof extension of the short ell) and at the far end of the long ell.

The church's original sanctuary was built in 1883 by the local Quaker community, as a replacement for the Pond Meeting House. It was a simple frame structure similar to its predecessor, and was enlarged about 1900 by the addition of the tower and an extension of the sanctuary space. The additions to the left are from a later period. Writer Rufus Jones, who was born and raised in South China, continued to summer here as an adult, and regularly attended Quaker meetings here, and was reported to speak at them often.

== See also ==
- National Register of Historic Places listings in Kennebec County, Maine
