= Shrewsbury Monthly Meeting =

Coordinates: 40.3244°N 74.0607°W

The Shrewsbury Monthly Meeting is a monthly meeting in the New York Yearly Meeting of the Religious Society of Friends.

== Meetings for Worship ==
The Meeting holds Meeting for Worship every Sunday starting at 10:30 a.m. for approximately one hour.
The Meeting follows the "unprogrammed" or Hicksite tradition, in which those who attend Meeting for Worship gather in quiet to pray or meditate, and can remain so unless someone feels moved by "The Light Within" to give a message to the assembled body. Like other unprogrammed meetings, the Meeting has no single minister who leads the worship or gives sermons, and music is not a customary part of worship.
The Meeting holds a Meeting for Worship with a Concern for Business on the second Sunday of the month, shortly after the end of Meeting for Worship, in which business affairs are discussed and decisions made through a "sense of the Meeting". A Pot Luck Luncheon is held on the fourth Sunday, and committee meetings are held on other Sundays.

== History ==
The Meeting was founded in 1665 by English-speaking settlers from Rhode Island and Long Island, and the Shrewsbury meeting both the oldest Quaker meeting and the oldest continuously existing religious group in New Jersey. Friends held meeting for worship in their homes until the first meetinghouse was built near what is now the New Jersey Transit station in Little Silver, N.J. A new meetinghouse was built in 1672 after property was purchased from John Lippincott at what is now the northeast corner of Sycamore Avenue and State Highway 35 in Shrewsbury, New Jersey
That same year the Meeting was visited by George Fox, the founder of Quakerism, in the first week of July during a tour he made of the English colonies from the Carolinas to New England. Fox led at least two meetings for worship then, including one that drew Quakers from most of New Jersey.
The current meetinghouse was built in 1816 of wood timber-frame construction and brick, possibly salvaged from the previous meetinghouse building.

== Activities ==
Every Sunday, at the finish or "rise" of Meeting for Worship, some Friends choose to gather at the corner of the two nearby streets and hold a "Witness for Peace," a short vigil in which Friends hold signs promoting peace.

== Relationships to other Quaker Meetings ==
The Meeting also is a member of the Shrewsbury-Plainfield Half-Yearly Meeting, along with three other Quaker meetings in central New Jersey: Manasquan Monthly Meeting, New Brunswick Monthly Meeting and Rahway-Plainfield Monthly Meeting. Friends from all four meetings meet twice a year to worship together and discuss topics of interest to all four meetings.
There is another Quaker Meeting named the Shrewsbury Meeting for Worship in Shrewsbury, UK, which is part of Britain Yearly Meeting.
