= Indiana Yearly Meeting =

- Classification: Quaker
- Orientation: Gurneyite
- Origin: 1821
- Separations: Central Yearly Meeting of Friends (1924); New Association of Friends (2013)
- Members: 1,969 (2018)

Indiana Yearly Meeting is a Yearly Meeting of the Religious Society of Friends, or Quakers.

Indiana Yearly Meeting (IYM) was established in 1821 and originally included all the Friends congregations west of the Scioto River, Ohio, as well as congregations in Indiana and Illinois.

(IYM) met for most of its history in Richmond, Indiana. For much of its history, IYM was the largest Quaker yearly meeting in the world.

IYM established Earlham College in 1847 as the Friends Boarding School, a boarding high school for the religious education of Quaker adolescents. It also established White's Institute (first a home for Native Americans, then an orphanage, and later a home for delinquent youths) in 1850, Quaker Haven Camp in 1926, and Friends Fellowship Community (a retirement home) in 1964.

While many Quaker yearly meetings have suffered serious divisions in their history, Indiana Yearly Meeting suffered no serious fractures and only three minor divisions during the 19th and 20th centuries. In the nineteenth century, this gave the yearly meeting a reputation for being both moderate and evangelical. As such, it was IYM that led the call for more centralization among Orthodox Gurneyite Friends, leading to the calling of the Friends Conference of 1887 and the Richmond Declaration.

In 1924, some Friends from the Indiana Yearly Meeting and Western Yearly Meeting formed the Central Yearly Meeting of Friends due to opposition to modernist theology.

In 2013, after several years of tension over the issues of homosexuality and the authority of the yearly meeting, IYM released eighteen of its congregations. Fifteen of these congregations ultimately formed the New Association of Friends. Forty-five congregations and two Latino church plants remained in IYM, affirming the traditional doctrinal statements of the yearly meeting and its statements on social issues, which tend to be biblically conservative and reach to the earliest days of Friends (Quakers). IYM has also accepted congregations that formerly belonged to Western Yearly Meeting. The congregations left Western Yearly Meeting over that body's growing liberalism.

IYM's active membership in 1912 was 20,000. In 2012, it was 3,017 members; after the creation of the NAF it fell to 1,969.

IYM has been headquartered in Muncie, Indiana, since 1965. Paid staff consists of a general superintendent, a director of youth and camping ministries, a ministerial advocate, and clerical staff. Yearly Meeting sessions are held at Quaker Haven Camp, near Syracuse, Indiana.

== See also ==
- Friends United Meeting
- Ohio Valley Yearly Meeting, formerly Indiana Yearly Meeting (Hicksite)
