= Ohio Valley Yearly Meeting =

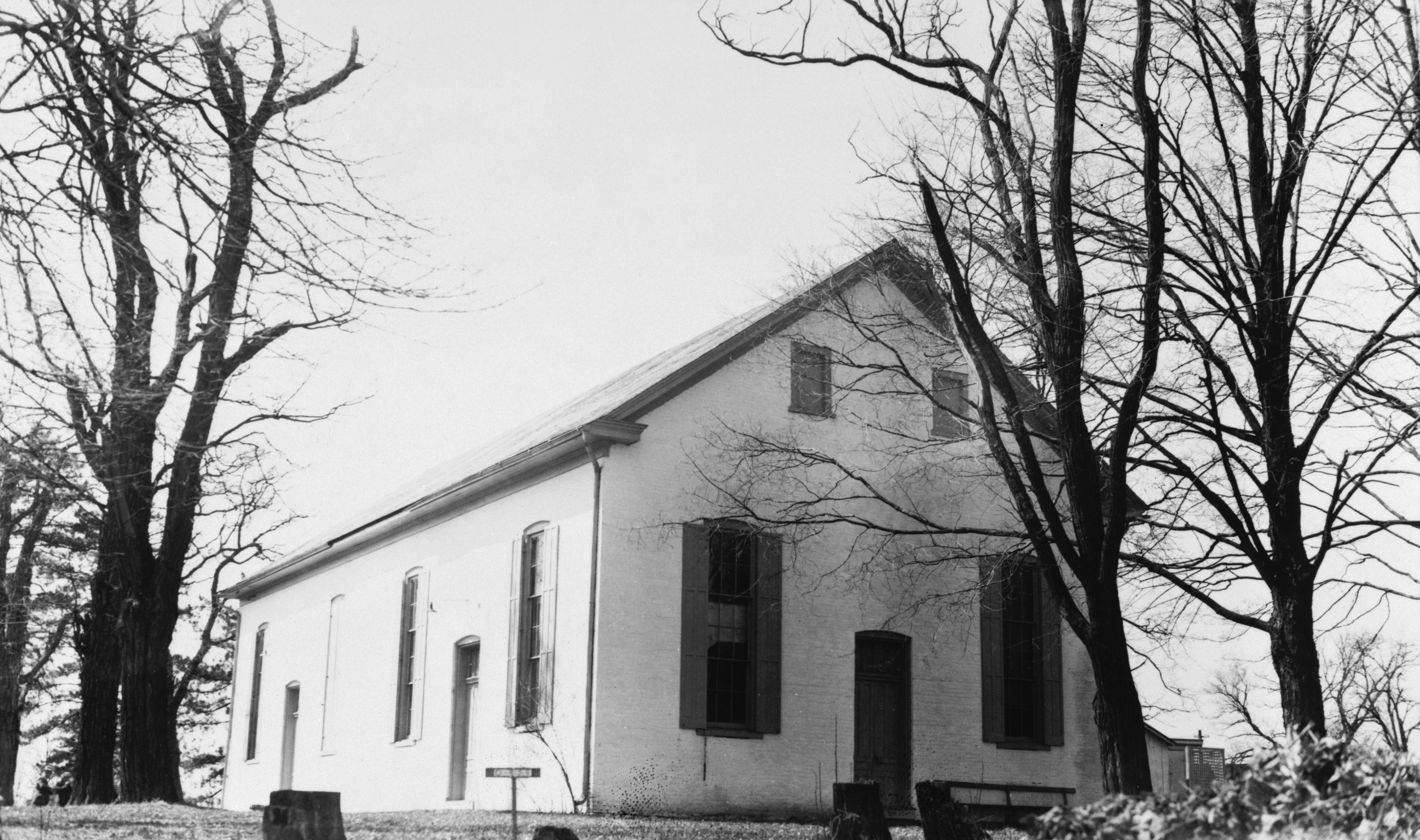
A Quaker "Monthly Meeting House" in Waynesville, Ohio

Ohio Valley Yearly Meeting is a Yearly Meeting of the Religious Society of Friends (Quakers). It is one of the seven bodies that represent the five different branches of the Society of Friends in Ohio.

It is affiliated with Friends General Conference and encompasses 20 monthly meetings in Southwest Ohio, Indiana and Kentucky.

After the formation of the Indiana Yearly Meeting in 1821, a number of offshoot organizations were formed, stretching from Ohio to Illinois. After a number of organizational changes and splits starting in 1830, the new name Ohio Valley Yearly Meeting was selected, and the meetings continue to date.

== See also ==
- Indiana Yearly Meeting
