= New Association of Friends =

Quaker organisation in America

The New Association of Friends is a Friends (Quaker) organization in the US.

The association is based in Indiana. In 2023, it is composed of sixteen congregations in Indiana, Ohio, Iowa and Michigan.

== History ==
The New Association (NAF) was formed in 2013 by members of fifteen congregations which conjointly left Indiana Yearly Meeting.

While the initial impetus for reconfiguration in Indiana Yearly Meeting (IYM) was the publication of West Richmond Friends Meeting's welcoming and affirming minute, the conversation had shifted towards authority within the yearly meeting. Indiana Yearly Meeting's faith and practice under the section on order and authority has this paragraph on subordination "Thus Monthly Meetings recognize the legitimate role of the Yearly Meeting in speaking and acting for the combined membership. Likewise the Yearly Meeting recognizes the freedom of Monthly Meetings and the validity of their prophetic voices. Each needs the other in order to be strong and vital. and both need the mediation of Christ and the guidance of the Holy Spirit." The paragraph in question articulates a mutual subordination between Meetings and the Yearly Meeting and the vitality of such mutual subordination. NAF seeks to maintain a similar picture of subordination and mutual submission described in Ephesians 5:21, "submitting to one another out of reverence for Christ Jesus."

The main disagreement was on the area of church governance. The IYM believed that Quakerism has a presbyterian system of church governance (one rule for everyone). The congregations which eventually made up the NAF believed that Quakerism followed a congregational system, with each separate congregation making their own decisions.

IYM's active membership in 2012 was 3,017 members; after the creation of the NAF it fell to 1,969.

== Current status ==
NAF is a voluntary association of monthly meetings, churches and individuals that support worship, ministry and service through the cultivation of Christian faith in the Quaker tradition.

NAF was accepted into the Friends World Committee in 2015. NAF is also a member of Friends United Meeting and Friends Committee on National Legislation.
