= Pond Meeting House =

Historic church in Maine, United States

- U.S. National Register of Historic Places
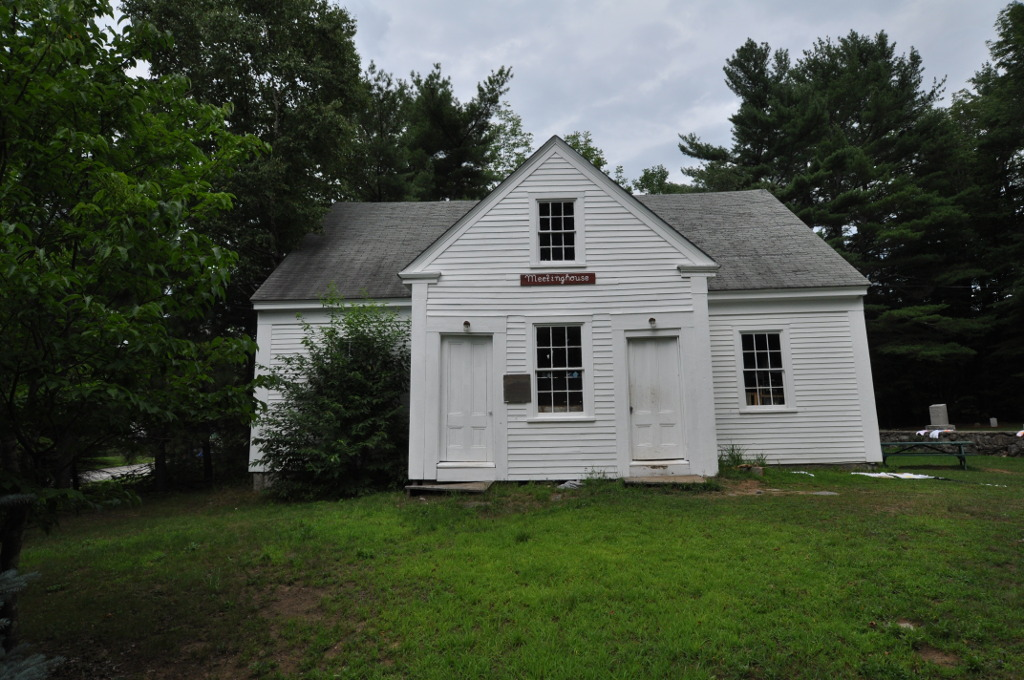

- Location within Maine Location within the United States
- Location: US 202, China, Maine
- Coordinates: 44°26′12″N 69°31′41″W
- Area: 0.5 acres (0.20 ha)
- Built: 1807
- MPS: Rufus Jones TR
- NRHP reference No.: 83000458
- Added to NRHP: August 04, 1983

Pond Meeting House is a historic Friends meeting house off United States Route 202 in China, Maine. Built in 1807, it is one of the oldest surviving buildings in the town, and an important element in the early life and spiritual growth of Quaker writer Rufus Jones. It was listed on the National Register of Historic Places in 1983.

== Description and history ==
The Pond Meeting House stands about 3 miles (4.8 km) north of the village of South China, on the east side of United States Route 202. It is set near the road, just south of the main entrance to the Friends Camp, on whose grounds it is located. It is a modest 1-1/2 story wood frame structure, with gabled roof and clapboarded exterior. A cross-gabled vestibule projects from one of the long sides, with a pair of entrances flanking a sash window, with a second sash window in the gable. The building has simple trim; the doors have modest cornices above. The interior of the building consists of a single large chamber, which was originally filled with pews and divided into two sections by a shutter mechanism; both the pews and shutters have been removed, and one portion of the chamber has been walled off to form a kitchen.

The meeting house was built in 1807, and is one of China's oldest surviving buildings. It was here that Rufus Jones, born and raised in South China, attended Quaker services. He would have been exposed to the teachings of important itinerant Quaker teachers here until the South China Meeting House was built closer to the Jones' home. When listed on the National Register in 1983, it was in use as part of a religious summer camp.

Today the meeting house is in use by Friends Camp, the Quaker camp under the care of New England Yearly Meeting of Friends. When the camp was founded in 1953, the meeting house was the only building, used for eating, sleeping, and worship. As the camp has grown and transformed, daily worship was moved to a larger building and the meeting house became the arts building.

== See also ==
- National Register of Historic Places listings in Kennebec County, Maine
