= Richmond Declaration =

Quaker confession of faith

The Richmond Declaration, also known as the Richmond Declaration of Faith, is a confession of faith of the Religious Society of Friends, being made by 95 Quakers (representatives of all Gurneyite Orthodox Friends Yearly Meetings) from around the world in September 1887, at a conference in Richmond, Indiana. It was a declaration of faith, and although Quakers do not subscribe to a creed, the Richmond Declaration of Faith has been used as a doctrinal standard by Orthodox Quakers (now represented by the Friends United Meeting), Holiness Quakers (represented by the Central Yearly Meeting of Friends) and Evangelical Quakers (represented by Evangelical Friends International), ever since.

The Declaration was "approved", "accepted", or "adopted" by the Orthodox Yearly Meetings of Indiana, Western, New England, New York, Baltimore, North Carolina, Iowa, and Canada. Among Orthodox Friends in North America, only Ohio and Philadelphia yearly meetings did not so act. The Friends United Meeting General Board reaffirmed the declaration as a statement of faith in February 2007. The Declaration appears in most Books of Discipline (Manuals of Faith and Practice) of Evangelical, Holiness and Friends United Meeting yearly meetings. In present-day Quakerdom, the vast majority are Evangelical Friends, thus making the Richmond Declaration of Faith representative of much of Quaker doctrine.

The London Yearly Meeting chose to neither endorse nor reject the declaration.

The Richmond Declaration of Faith includes "assertions about God, Christ, the Bible, resurrection and atonement, and other Christian basics", as well as "core Quaker beliefs about simplicity, oaths, peace, and sacraments."

== Criticism ==
Chuck Fager, a Liberal Quaker, claimed that the Richmond Declaration did not represent all branches of Friends and lamented that it had been used to expel ministers such as Joel Bean; in Fager's view, the confession does not represent what he sees as authentic Friends theology. Quaker author Bill Samuel rebutted Fager's claims, stating that the Richmond Declaration of Faith is consistent with early Quaker thought, inclusive of Robert Barclay's Apology for the True Christian Divinity; Samuel stated that Fager read "an awful lot between the lines" to make negative claims about the Richmond Declaration of Faith.

Though it was primarily written by a British Friend, Joseph Bevan Braithwaite, the London Yearly Meeting did not adopt the Richmond Declaration in 1888, after progressive younger members characterized by "theological and social drift" opposed its adoption in an extensive debate that "lasted for over five hours". Supported by many of the older, longstanding members in the London Yearly Meeting, Braithwaite saw the Richmond Declaration of Faith as being a bulwark against "unsound and dangerous doctrine" in times when Friends were "in a state of discipline and warfare".
