= Quaker music =

In the early days of Quakerism, music was rejected as a non-spontaneous part of worship. As the early Quakers tried to distance themselves from the practices of the English Church at the time, they also distanced themselves from the church traditions of singing music, even Psalms, together. Absolute honesty and integrity was important to them, and people singing words together were often expressing thoughts that even if they were spiritually profound were not actually expressing true experience and profound beliefs of the singers, who were often merely parroting them. Music was at times also viewed as frivolous, and not in line with the value of Simplicity, in other words a distraction from what was really important in life. However, they did approve of "singing in the spirit," when the act of singing and making music was a natural and organic method of expressing belief.

== 19th and 20th centuries ==
During the 19th century there was a split within Quakerism, with one branch wanting to return to some of the ways of Protestant churches, with a programmed service including hymns, and the other wishing to retain the traditional service of silent worship punctuated by spontaneous ministry. Although non-programmed Quaker Meetings for Worship remained silent, for the most part, with music rarely used, the attitudes towards music began to shift towards a more relaxed view in the mid-nineteenth century. In particular, many of the poems of John Greenleaf Whittier were set to music and well received.

The hymn "How Can I Keep from Singing?," first published in 1868 by Robert Lowry, was adopted by twentieth century Quakers. The lyrics to the first verse are as follows:

My life flows on in endless song;
Above earth's lamentation,
I hear the sweet, tho' far-off hymn
That hails a new creation;
Thro' all the tumult and the strife
I hear the music ringing;
It finds an echo in my soul—
How can I keep from singing?

One of the most notable versions was created and performed by Peter Seeger, who was told it was a Quaker song. The song was, and continues to be, such a favorite of the Quaker community that is often wrongly attributed to Quaker or Shaker origins.

20th century English Quaker songwriters include Donald Swann of Flanders & Swann, and Sydney Carter, whose best-known song is "Lord of the Dance".

== Contemporary British Quaker choral music ==
Historically, British Quakers had been especially reluctant to include music in their Meetings. However, London Quaker youth arts group, The Leaveners, was founded in 1978 and have since brought organized music to the Quaker community. They have commissioned and performed multiple pieces, and developed the Quaker Festival Chorus.

== Contemporary American Quaker musicians ==
Carrie Newcomer, Annie Patterson, Peter Blood, David Wilcox, Joan Baez

Jon Watts is a Quaker musician, poet, and filmmaker. He has created and released six musical albums, combining spoken word, rap, hip hop, and folk styles. Specifically, he practices Liberal Quakerism, and uses his music to speak about the Liberal Quaker experience and ideals. He currently travels and performs his music, and speaks about his life in the Society of Friends. He is also the director of “QuakerSpeak,” a YouTube channel which focuses on interviews with Quakers of different backgrounds.

Watts graduated from the Quaker Leadership Scholarship Program at Guilford College in 2006. It was for his senior project at Guilford that Watts created the album A Few Songs Occasioned, composed of songs about the beginnings of the Quaker movement. This work inspired him to pursue a career creating “Spirit-led music.” His most popular, and most controversial, song to date is "Friend Speaks My Mind," for which he created a YouTube video entitled "Dance Party Erupts During Quaker Meeting for Worship."

Susan Stark is a Quaker singer and songwriter with a number of songs on YouTube. Her cassette Child of The Nuclear Age contained track "Live Up to the Light", setting to music the words of Caroline Fox describing a moment of profound spiritual experience in 1841.

== Sources ==
=== References ===
- http://www.friendsjournal.org/bum-rush-the-internet/
- Bourke, Rosamund (2003) "Quaker Beliefs: Diverse yet Distinctive," Quaker Studies: Vol. 7: Iss. 2, Article 7. http://digitalcommons.georgefox.edu/quakerstudies/vol7/iss2/7
- https://web.archive.org/web/20150411091556/http://www.haverford.edu/library/special/exhibitions/online_exhibitions/quakermusic/index.html
