= Central Yearly Meeting of Friends =

Annual Quaker event

- Classification: Quakerism
- Orientation: Holiness
- Theology: Gurneyite
- Origin: 1926
- Separated from: Five Years Meeting
- Congregations: 8 (2010)
- Members: 290 (2010)

Central Yearly Meeting of Friends is a yearly meeting of Friends (Quaker) churches located in Indiana, North Carolina, Arkansas, and Ohio. Central Yearly Meeting of Friends is a part of the Gurneyite wing of the Orthodox branch of Quakerism, and is aligned with the conservative holiness movement. Meeting for worship is programmed and led by pastors.

On First-month 31, 1924 (January 31, 1924), the Union Quarterly Meeting was formed from monthly meetings that were originally a part of the Western Yearly Meeting; certain monthly meetings that were a part of the Indiana Yearly Meeting formed the Eastern Quarterly Meeting. The Union and Eastern Quarterly Meetings remained a part of the Five Years Meeting until 1926, when they separated and together became the Central Yearly Meeting on Ninth-month 17th, 1926 (September 17, 1926). The Central Yearly Meeting strongly supported the Richmond Declaration, a confession of faith upheld by the Orthodox branch of Quakerism.

Central Yearly Meeting is associated with Union Bible College. Along with the Northwest Yearly Meeting of Friends, the Central Yearly Meeting of Friends sponsors missionary work in Bolivia.

These Quakers publish a periodical known as the Friends Evangel. An annual camp meeting is held near Muncie, Indiana, every August.

Members of the Central Yearly Meeting of Friends practice the traditional Quaker teaching of plain dress, part of the Quaker testimony of simplicity. The Central Yearly Meeting lays emphasis on the Quaker doctrine of perfection, which is explicated in Teaching of Evangelical Friends as Gleaned from George Fox's Journal and Friends Disciplines, by J. Edwin Newby.

== See also ==
- Conservative Friends
