= Meeting for worship =

Practice of the Religious Society of Friends (or "Quakers")

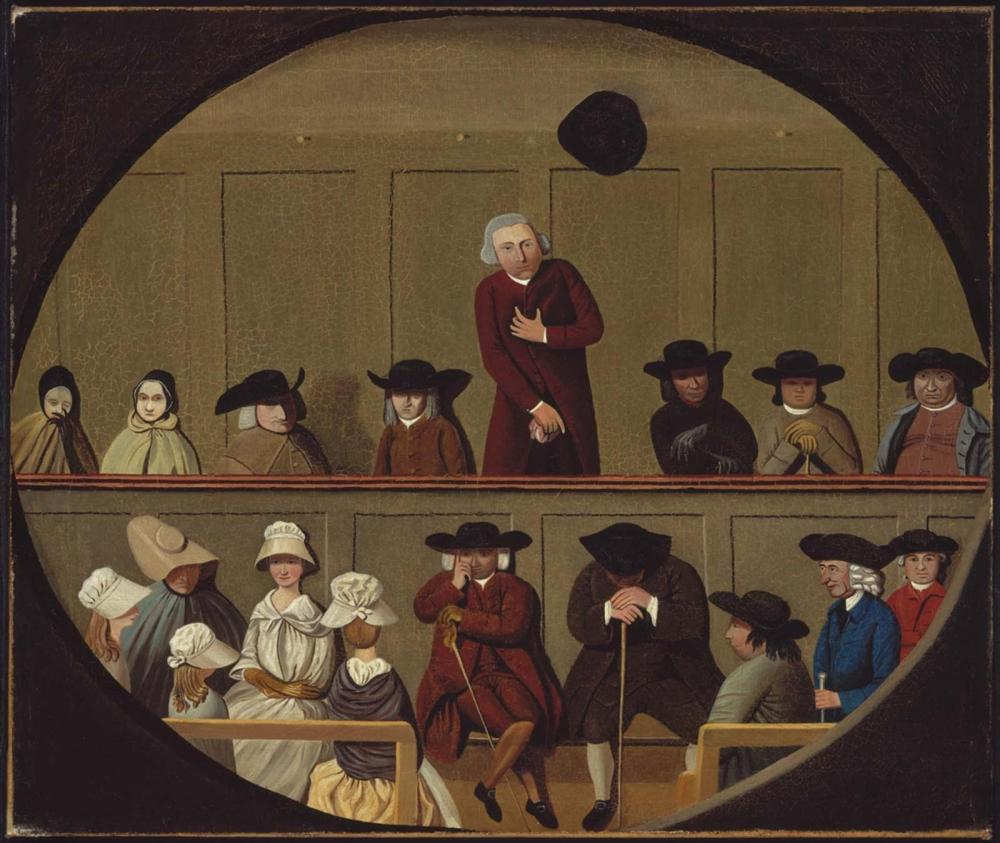
Painting of a meeting for worship, c. 1790

A meeting for worship is what members of the Religious Society of Friends (Quakers) call their religious service. Different branches of Quakers have different styles of worship, primarily consisting of three types. A meeting for worship in English-speaking countries typically lasts around an hour, and most often occur within meeting houses.

== Types ==
=== Unprogrammed worship ===
Unprogrammed worship consists of sitting in silence and listening inwardly to the Spirit, traditionally associated with God. (Note: Some Quakers view compulsion to speak from a Secular point of view, particularly Nontheist Quakers) At any point during the meeting, an individual attending the meeting may speak if they feel compelled to do so, usually when that person feels that the spirit (whatever they perceive it to be) has guided them to give a message to the others. However, speaking during a meeting is not mandatory, and meetings can go the entire duration without it occurring. After someone speaks, several minutes are traditionally allowed to pass before anyone else speaks, to allow the message to be considered carefully. Quakers do not answer or argue about others' messages during meeting for worship. The duration of these meetings is often around an hour.

Many unprogrammed meetings follow worship with a time for participants to share. Some ask for joys and sorrows; others for something a person considered sharing during worship. These types of meetings are most often found in countries such as the United States and the United Kingdom.

=== Programmed worship ===
In programmed meetings, one or multiple members of the meeting serve in pastoral positions. These meetings often include many elements similar to traditional Protestant services, such as a sermon and hymns, led by the pastors. Some programmed meetings also include a time during the service for silent, expectant waiting and messages from the participants, similar to unprogrammed ones.

=== Semi-programmed worship ===
Some meetings have a mixed system of worship, commonly referred to as "semi-programmed," which combines elements of programmed worship, such as sermons, with a long period of unprogrammed silence. These meetings are most often found in the United States, though they can exist elsewhere.

== History ==
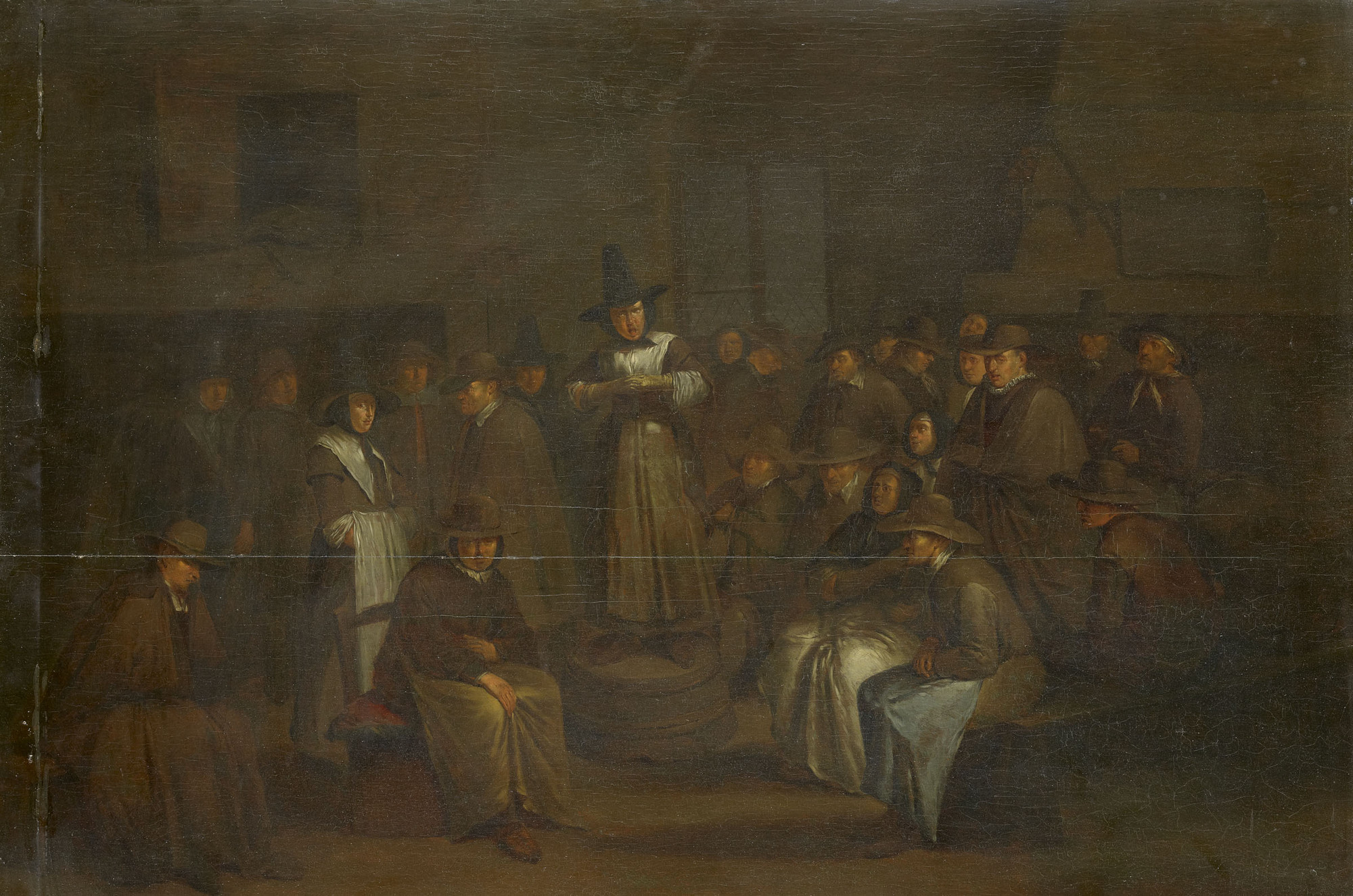
The Quaker Meeting, by Egbert van Heemskerck, Royal Collection

For some time after their founding, the Quakers, led by George Fox, would gather in numerous locations, particularly their meetinghouses or within jail cells, to sit in silence. They did this out of expectance that the spirit of God would be present with them. These early Quakers rejected the pastoral and priestly systems of the established churches, particularly the Church of England. Free practice for Quakers was illegal until the Toleration Act of 1688, and therefore many early Quakers faced criminal charges and persecution, and in many instances were unable to freely meet to practice worship.

In the 19th century, major splits occurred within the Quaker movement. One of these, the Hicksite-Orthodox Split, arose due to a dispute over the adoption of mainline Protestant principles among several Quaker bodies. Some Quakers, known as the Orthodox Quakers, believed that they should begin conforming to traditional Protestant norms, such as a stronger emphasis on the Bible in meetings, rather than the inner light, while others, represented by Elias Hicks, supported a stronger emphasis on the inner light, with the Bible, while still largely seen as important, being secondary to the "Spirit of God". Hicks' supporters preferred continued unprogrammed worship, while many of the Orthodox Quakers adopted the programmed worship of other Protestant groups. Many Orthodox Quakers also adopted the usage of music during meetings, despite the fact early Quakers opposed the practice.

These divisions eventually evolved into three groups of Quakers, Liberal Quakers, Conservative Quakers, and Evangelical Quakers. Liberal Quakers promote the importance of the inner light in meetings for worship, while putting emphasis on unprogrammed meetings and a lack of pastors. Unlike other branches, not all Liberal Quakers are Christian, although many are, and scripture is often not strongly emphasized in their meetings. Conservative Quakers promote the importance of the Bible in meetings, while still maintaining unprogrammed meetings for worship. Evangelical Quakers promote evangelism, and they put a much stronger emphasis on the Bible than any other group of Quakers. Their meetings for worship are almost always programmed. There are also Quaker bodies such as the Friends United Meeting, which maintains many of the principles of the Orthodox Quakers, however their meeting types vary, with some being unprogrammed, semi-programmed, and programmed.
