= Malone University =

Christian university in Canton, Ohio, US

- Former names: Cleveland Bible College (1892–1957); Malone College (1957–2008)
- Motto: Christ's Kingdom First
- Type: Private university
- Established: 1892; 134 years ago
- Religious affiliation: Evangelical Friends Church – Eastern Region
- Academic affiliations: Christian College Consortium, Council for Christian Colleges and Universities
- Endowment: $19.4 million (2017)
- President: Gregory Miller
- Provost: Christina Schnyders
- Dean: Anna Meadows
- Students: 1,613 (spring 2018)
- Undergraduates: 1,257 (spring 2018)
- Postgraduates: 356 (spring 2018)
- Location: Canton, Ohio, U.S. 40°49′34″N 81°22′35″W
- Campus: Urban, 97 acres (39 ha), 26 buildings
- Colors: Blue and red
- Nickname: Pioneers
- Sporting affiliations: NCAA Division II – G-MAC
- Website: malone.edu

Malone University is a private Christian university in Canton, Ohio, United States. It was founded in 1892 by Walter and Emma Malone as a small, co-educational Bible institute called Cleveland Bible College. The institution has always maintained a close relationship with an evangelical branch of Quakerism, the Evangelical Friends Church – Eastern Region.

In addition to Malone University's traditional undergraduate college, the school also maintains a graduate school offering master's degrees in a wide field of professional studies, an online school with a variety of bachelor's programs, and degree completion programs in management and nursing. The graduate school also has a post-degree professional development center that offers workshops and certificates.

== History ==
Malone University was founded in 1892, in Cleveland, Ohio, as Cleveland Bible College by Quaker religious leaders J. Walter and Emma Malone. It was established to train young people for inner-city ministry and social service in the Quaker tradition. After beginning with small gains, the school eventually became synonymous with service to the Cleveland community at beginning of the 20th century, growing substantially with every new year. It was originally located at 3201 Euclid Avenue in downtown Cleveland but was eventually forced to relocate in 1956 after the state took the property for constructing Interstate 90.

Faced with the decision to stay in Cleveland or move, the board of trustees finally decided on Canton, Ohio as a good location where the school could become a leader in higher education. A thriving industrial metropolitan city at the time, Canton was the only city in the country with a population over 100,000 to not have an institution of higher education. It was this fact, among others, that played a key role in the decision to move the school to Canton on a 150-acre (0.61 km^{2}) property between 30th and 25th streets from north to south, and Cleveland Avenue and Harvard from west to east. At the time of relocation the board also chose to change the name of the school to Malone College, in honor of the school's founders, J. Walter and Emma Brown Malone.

It was also at the time of the move that the school began expanding its academic programs. After only a short time, Malone had gone from a small Bible college in downtown Cleveland to a growing undergraduate college in the liberal arts tradition in Canton, Ohio offering degrees in education, political science, history, music and psychology. This was all a part of the overall mission of the board to use the forced move as an opportunity to grow the institution and become a regional leader in broader fields of professional and academic studies.

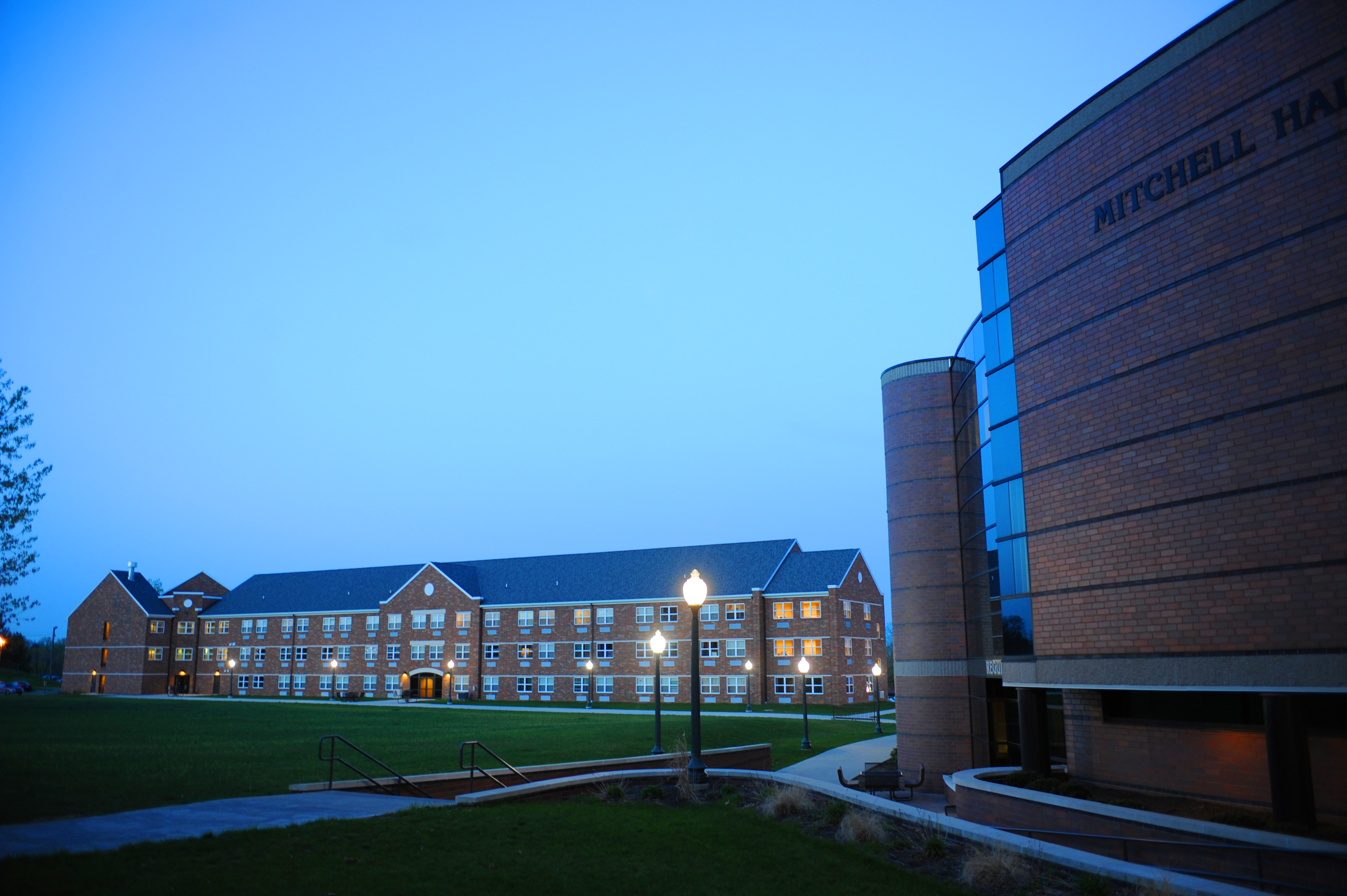
Overlooking Mitchell Hall (right) and Blossom Hall (center)

In February 2008, the Malone College board of trustees voted unanimously to rebrand as Malone University. The move to a university reflected a transition that had capped off in 1999, when Malone adopted a university structure on which to operate. According to the institutional press release, the transition to Malone University reflected the institution's "mission and emphasized the potential for enhanced educational opportunities within the liberal arts context for the growing number of undergraduate students already studying in 90 different academic programs". The rebranding process took place under the leadership of then-president Gary Streit.

Since becoming a university in 2008, Malone has experienced growth not only in academic offerings, but also in student enrollment and campus property. In 2009, the university completed construction on its newest residential hall, Blossom Hall. The building was named in honor of long-time philanthropist and former president of the Cleveland Orchestra, Dudley S. Blossom. The university currently sits on 96 acres (390,000 m^{2}).

== Academics ==
The entrance to Mitchell Hall, which houses the School of Business and Leadership and the School of Education and Human Development

There are four academic divisions within the university. Though these schools have undergone much expansion since Malone rebranded as a university in 2008, each school has operated independently since the late 1990s.

- Division of Business and Technologies
- Division of Humanities, Education, and Ministry
- Division of Natural and Health Sciences
- Division of Social and Behavioral Sciences

Malone University offers Bachelor of Arts and Bachelor of Science degree programs in more than 80 areas of concentration. In addition to the university's 80 academic majors, the institution offers 40 academic minors.

== Student life ==
Though there are approximately 1,500 undergraduate and graduate students enrolled at the university, the majority of the student population are commuters from surrounding areas within a 60 miles radius or online. The campus life prides itself on a high level of community and connectedness. All students are encouraged to take part in community-building activities both in and outside of the classroom. Incoming students are required to sign a "Community Agreement," which stipulates the biblical expectations of members of the Malone community.

The university offers campus-wide events and activities through the Campus Activity Board (CAB), and has more than 75 clubs and organizations for students.

== Athletics ==
The Malone Pioneers are the athletic teams of Malone University. The university is a member of the NCAA and competes at the Division II level in the Great Midwest Athletic Conference (G-MAC). The university offers 18 sports, including baseball, men's and women's basketball, men's and women's cross country, men's and women's golf, men's and women's lacrosse, men's and women's soccer, softball, men's and women's swimming and diving, men's and women's indoor track & field, men's and women's outdoor track and field, and women's volleyball.

Prior to Malone's NCAA Division II membership, the Pioneers participated in the National Association of Intercollegiate Athletics (NAIA) and the American Mideast Conference (AMC). The multiple-year transition process in which Malone was not eligible to compete in NCAA post-season competition began in July 2010 when Malone was granted an exploratory membership to the NCAA Division II. In October 2011, Malone was accepted as a member of the GLIAC for all 18 intercollegiate athletic programs. The university met all requirements and graduated to provisional status before Malone became a full member of the NCAA in July 2013.

== Community guidelines and restrictions on homosexuality ==
All employees, as a condition of hiring, must agree to live in accordance with the University's Statement of Community Responsibilities. These guidelines include a prohibition on homosexuality.

In 2021, professor Karyn Collie resigned after notifying the university that she intended to marry a woman. She resigned, knowing that "the marriage would violate her employment contract." Collie's forced resignation led to demonstrations from Malone students including a sit-in during chapel services.

== Notable alumni ==
- Karin Bergquist, musical artist, singer/songwriter for Ohio band Over the Rhine
- JB DeRosa, NBA referee
- Linford Detweiler, musical artist, singer/songwriter for Ohio band Over the Rhine
- Dave Douglas, music producer and musician, known for his work in Relient K, Gypsy Parade, and Attack Cat
- Ashton Dulin, professional football player
- John B. Ellington, Jr., Air National Guard general
- Mark Engel, Anglican bishop
- Susan Norris Fitkin, founder and first president of Nazarene Missions International
- Christina Hagan, member of the Ohio House of Representatives 2011–2018
- Matt Hoopes, founding member of rock band Relient K
- Tyler Light, professional golfer
- Justin Lower, professional golfer
- Timothy Mack, 2004 Olympic gold medalist in the Pole Vault, multiple-time USATF Champion (also attended University of Tennessee)
- Robin Meade, CNN anchor (graduated from Ashland University, but attended Malone before transferring)
- Tony Migliozzi, ultra-marathoner and 2015 IAU 50 km World Champion
- David Rawson, Ambassador Extraordinary and Plenipotentiary to Rwanda and Mali
- Jeff Timmons, founding member of pop group 98 Degrees
