= Conservative Friends =

Subset of Religious Society of Friends (Quakers)

- Classification: Quaker
- Orientation: Unprogrammed
- Theology: Wilburite
- Distinct fellowships: Ohio Yearly Meeting North Carolina Yearly Meeting Iowa Yearly Meeting
- Region: Worldwide
- Congregations: 40 in US (2010)
- Members: 1,976 in US (2010)

Conservative Friends are members of the Wilburite branch of the Religious Society of Friends (Quakers). In the United States, Conservative Friends belong to three Yearly Meetings: the Ohio Yearly Meeting (Conservative), the North Carolina Yearly Meeting (Conservative), and the Iowa Yearly Meeting (Conservative). Of these, the Ohio Yearly Meeting is the most traditional. Many UK Friends affiliated with the Conservative branch of Quakerism are organized as the Friends in Christ and tend to use the terms Primitive or Plain.

There is no single unifying association of Conservative Friends, though a Wider Fellowship of Conservative Friends general gathering is held every two years. The term "Conservative Friends" does not refer to a conservative political orientation, but rather to a traditional interpretation of Quakerism harkening back to the beliefs and practices of the early Friends. The Central Yearly Meeting of Friends is theologically conservative and plain dress-wearing, but since they are part of the Gurneyite branch of Quakers, they are not classed under the designation of Conservative Friends.

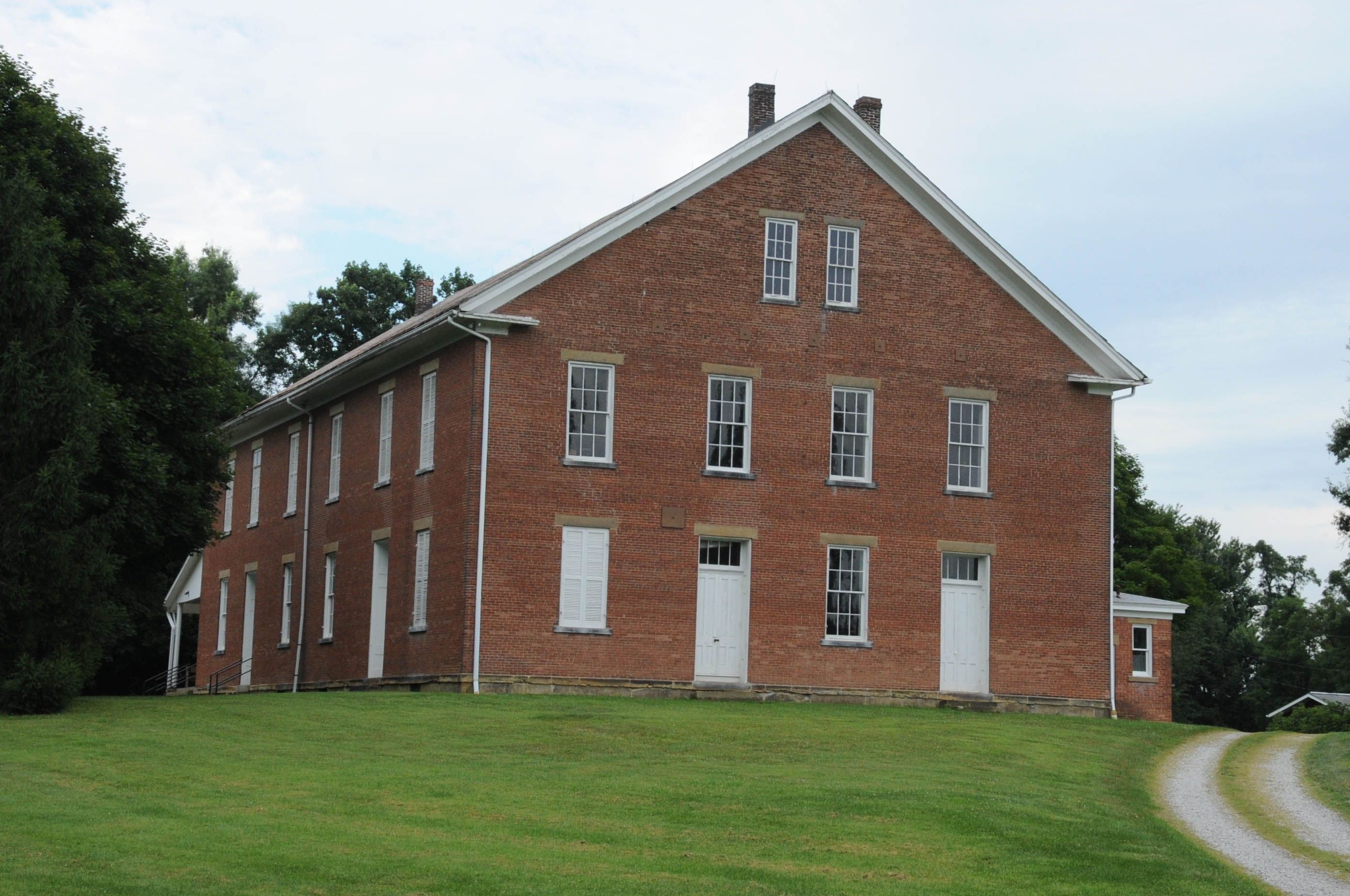
The meetinghouse of the Stillwater Monthly Meeting, part of the Ohio Yearly Meeting of Friends

== Characteristics of Conservative Friends ==
The origin of Conservative Friends is found in early 19th-century schisms, first with liberal, "Hicksite" Friends and then with evangelical-oriented "Gurneyite" Friends. The Conservative Friends is derived from the Orthodox Friends in the former schism, and in the latter schism, what are now called Conservative Friends were the "Wilburite" branch of Orthodox Friends. Through the schisms, they sought continuity of traditional practices and theological emphases, over new ideas based on outside influences.

The early Quakers, following Fox, taught that as a result of the New Birth through the power of the Holy Spirit, man could be free from actual sinning if he continued to rely on the inward light and "focus on the cross of Christ as the center of faith". Theologically, Conservative Friends continue to teach the historical Quaker doctrines on salvation and perfection.

The Conservative Friends have tended to follow the overt customs of plain speech and dress (in keeping with the Quaker doctrine of Testimony of Simplicity) more than other branches of the Society of Friends. While a minority of Conservative Friends wear traditional plain dress (it is not mandated), they are most associated today with that traditional Quaker folkway. Historically "ruffles and lace and other forms of ornamentation, as well as unnecessary cuffs and collars and lapels and buttons, were forbidden." George Fox implored fellow Quakers to wear plain dress:

Friends, keep out of the vain fashions of the world; let not your eyes, minds, and spirits run after every fashion (in attire) of the nations; for that will lead you from the solid life into unity with that spirit that leads to follow the fashions of the nations, after every fashion of apparel that gets up: but mind that which is sober and modest, and keep to your plain fashions, that you may judge the world's vanity and spirit, in its vain fashions, and show a constant spirit in the truth and plainness.

For Conservative Friends, plain dress for men usually includes "a broad-brimmed felt or straw hat, trousers with suspenders instead of a belt, and muted colors in the fabrics: blacks, whites, greys, browns", sometimes with "broad-fall trouser cuts". Quaker men traditionally are clean-shaven. Conservative Friends women have traditionally practiced headcovering as taught in 1 Corinthians 11:2–10 by wearing a "scarf, bonnet, or cap" and "wear long-sleeved, long dresses".

Conservative Friends also maintain the type of business meeting which was in use among all branches of Friends until the middle of the twentieth century.

Each Yearly Meeting publishes a small book called The Discipline which includes the polity and beliefs of the body; this book is called Faith and Practice by certain yearly meetings of other Quaker associations. The Discipline includes provisions for business organization; the naming of ministers, elders, and overseers; marriage procedures; and the Advices and Queries. The Queries are read on the local monthly meeting level, with the next higher levels (Quarterly and Yearly Meetings) summarizing the answers from the subordinate meetings. An example of one of the Queries is as follows:

Do we cherish a forgiving spirit and strive to "walk in love, as Christ also hath loved us"? Is each one of us careful for the reputation of others? Are we ever mindful to love our neighbor as ourselves? If differences threaten to disrupt the Christian harmony between the members, is prompt action taken? —The Book of Discipline of Ohio Yearly Meeting of the Religious Society of Friends, 2022

An example one of the Advices is as follows:

Use vigilant care, dear Friends, not to overlook those promptings of love and truth which you may feel in your hearts; for these are the tender leadings of the Spirit of God. Nor should any of us resist God's workings within us, for it is His redemptive love which strives to show us our darkness, and lead us to true repentance, and to His marvelous light. "Behold, I stand at the door and knock: if any man hear my voice and open the door, I will come in to him, and will sup with him, and he with me" (Rev. 3:20). —The Book of Discipline of Ohio Yearly Meeting of the Religious Society of Friends, 2022

Conservative Friends seek to maintain a Christian witness by living a careful lifestyle that is reflective of nonconformity to the world; The Book of Discipline of Ohio Yearly Meeting of the Religious Society of Friends has a section on Temperance, for example. It states:

In view of the evils arising from the use of tobacco and intoxicating drinks, we urge all to abstain from using them, from offering them to others, and from having any part in their production, manufacture, or sale. Do not let the claims of "good fellowship" or the fear of seeming peculiar prevent you from standing by principles which you have conscientiously adopted.

The same text emphasizes the importance of daily family worship in Quaker families:

Be diligent in the reading of the Bible and other spiritually helpful writings. Gather daily in your families for worship. Such times have a special value in bringing little children, especially into the experience of united worship, and so preparing them for the larger meeting for worship, as they learn in silence to bow to the power of God.

== History ==
=== Background ===
George Fox, the father of Quakerism, taught that apart from Christ himself, there was "none upon the earth" that could cure unbelief and sinfulness. The inward experience of Christ, confirmed by the Bible, was the foundation of the Religious Society of Friends. The following characterized the Quaker message:

1) an in-breaking of God's power;

2) a realization of how sinful the believer's life had been, how far it had fallen short;

3) the chance to repent and accept the new life;

4) the experience of regeneration;

5) an impulse to gather with others who had had this experience;

6) mission to those who had not yet had this experience.

Additionally, Fox taught the doctrine of perfection—"spiritual intimacy with God and Christ, entailing an ability to resist sin and temptation".

Friends have traditionally not observed sacraments, historically citing Jeremiah 31:31–34 and embracing "this experience of a new covenant with God written on their hearts, rather than in outward forms". Additionally,

Early Quakers felt they were in the vanguard of this Second Coming which would come to all and bring about global transformation. Again, building on Jeremiah, but also Revelation in particular, these early Friends claimed that this Second Coming was an inward experience. This new reality available to all meant that the way Christianity had been operating was now redundant and anachronistic, belonging only to an age now past. Thus, as well as not needing priests...this interpretation of the direct encounter between humanity and God, and the continual nature of the transformation it brought, also meant that churches and outward sacraments could be dispensed with. Revelation 3:20 talks about Christ supping inwardly with those who respond to his knocking, and Friends thought this communion replaced the passage in 1 Corinthians 11:26 that instructs the believers to break the bread until the Lord comes. The Lord had come again. There was a new supper to celebrate, the marriage supper of the Lamb. ... Quakers thus presented themselves as the end of waiting, both for full reformation, but also, in the much bigger picture, for the unfolding Second Coming. ‘Christ is come and is Coming’ they claimed. Christ had come to those who had experienced ‘convincement’ and would come to all. Quakers were the true Church, God's elect and God's vanguard, but all could be part of the elect and attain salvation; all were spiritually equal.

=== The Hicksite–Orthodox schism ===
Friends in the United States became divided during the early years of the nineteenth century.

In the mid-1820s, wealthy Friends in leadership positions in Quaker organizations in Philadelphia began to "express disunity" (openly disagree) with the ministry of Elias Hicks, a rural traveling minister from Long Island, New York, whose ministry emphasized direct experience of God over reliance on scripture. Hicks himself was concerned that urban, successful and wealthy Friends particularly in Philadelphia but also in the United Kingdom, had strayed from the testimonies and early practices of Friends. Of particular concern to Hicksite Friends were the notions of the authority of scripture over the Light of the Inward Christ, endorsement of justification and entire sanctification over the sense of gradual convincement, and the use of Trinitarian language.

Also of concern for both sides was the relative authority of the Yearly Meeting (favored by the Orthodox) and the Monthly Meetings (favored by Hicksite Friends). Hicks, who like his followers was from rural farming stock, was adamant that Friends stay a "peculiar people" behind the "hedge" of Quaker plainness while the Orthodox Friends were eager to integrate with modern urban society. Both groups were active in traditional Friends social justice movements, such as the abolition of slavery and right ordered care for the mentally ill.

Orthodox Friends ministers, Joseph Hoag and Stephen Grellet, spoke widely about statements made by Hicks in ministry which suggested that portions of the Bible were not accurate, particularly Hicks's view that the virgin birth was historically suspect and not necessary to salvation. Hicks always maintained that he spoke the words given him by God in what Friends called immediate revelation, but this proved unacceptable to Orthodox Quakers. Hicksite Quakers left PYM (1827–28) to form a new Yearly Meeting, with other yearly meetings soon to follow in division. The majority of Quakers distanced themselves from the Hicksites, and those in Britain refused to correspond with the Hicksites.

Many scholars have written about various aspects of these controversies. A good short summary is Larry Kuenning's "Quaker Theologies in the 19th Century Separations", but for more depth, see H. Larry Ingle, Quakers in Conflict: The Hicksite Reformation (Philadelphia: Pendle Hill, 1998).

=== Second (Gurneyite–Wilburite) separation ===
Within a decade, a rift was beginning to divide the Orthodox coalition. Most ministers and elders were placing additional emphasis upon the writings of the earliest Friends (called at the time the "primitive" Friends), while other Friends were becoming influenced by the growing Evangelical movement, in particular a group of British Friends ministers associated to varying degrees with Isaac Crewdson and the Beacon movement which began in 1830 in England.

The ministers and elders who emphasized the "primitive" Friends testimony became increasingly uneasy with the growing Evangelically-oriented ministry. The first official action in the movement took place when Elisha Bates, a former Clerk of Ohio Yearly Meeting, travelled to England without the official credentials (an endorsed travelling minute). On this trip, Bates participated in a baptism ceremony (Quakers had avoided external rites like baptism and eucharist/communion). When he returned to Ohio, he was not only "read out of meeting" (stripped of his membership), he was disowned by the Friends (a public declaration of removal from membership). One of the evangelical English ministers, Joseph John Gurney, travelled to America to support Bates and to meet with Hicksite Friends.

Instead of healing the wounds, Gurney's visit exacerbated the growing rift among the Orthodox Friends. Gurney believed that the position of the scriptures had been lowered too much among Friends; although he did not totally discount the influence or necessity of the Holy Spirit, Gurney placed the two as separate influences. He encouraged Friends to participate in government, including voting in elections (at the time, most Friends did not participate in politics). Gurney had decided as a young man not to wear the traditional Quaker clothing, stating once that he only wore a broad-brimmed hat one day of his life. He was a powerful minister and a prolific writer. Travelling among Orthodox Friends at a time when ministers were considered to be examples for the youth, he provided an example which was troubling to those Friends who were dedicated to the "primitive" movement.

During Gurney's visit to North America in 1837–1838, there was opposition to his ministry throughout the Orthodox yearly meetings. A minister-schoolteacher in Rhode Island, John Wilbur, objected to Gurney's use of the early Wesleyan understanding of entire sanctification. Wilbur wrote an anonymous article that argued for the "primitive" Quaker understanding of continual, daily interaction with the Holy Spirit. Thomas B. Gould, another Friend from Newport, RI, also spoke with Gurney during his visit and outlined where he thought his views departed from those of the early Friends. Other opposition to Gurney was based in the two Orthodox yearly meetings already known for their stand on the importance of an inward transformation (Ohio and Philadelphia).

The first division between the so-called Wilburite and Gurneyite Friends took place in Rhode Island in 1842. When the pro-Gurney majority of the Orthodox yearly meeting objected to Wilbur's writings about Gurney, they re-organized the structure of Friends meetings in western Rhode Island and stripped Wilbur of his membership. When Wilbur appealed his disownment, his quarterly meeting divided. New England Yearly Meeting (Orthodox) was unable to decide which quarterly meeting to recognize, which precipitated a division throughout all of New England.

The Wilbur-Gurney divisions continued for 15 years. New York Yearly Meeting (Orthodox) divided in 1847, and a Wilbur-influenced body was formed in Indiana. The major event in the divisions, however, was the division in Ohio Yearly Meeting (Orthodox) in 1854. This event led to divisions in Baltimore and Iowa later in 1854.

Philadelphia Yearly Meeting (Orthodox) initially recognized the Wilburite New England Yearly Meeting but later ended all official relations with other yearly meetings (including New England) in order to prevent its small Gurneyite minority from leaving. However, Philadelphia's Haverford College continued to educate Conservative Friends as other Quaker colleges (except for the Hicksite Swarthmore) were under the care of Gurneyite yearly meetings.

== Conservative Friends in the present day ==
By 1905, there were seven Conservative Friends Yearly Meetings left in America and Canada as well as an unaffiliated but Conservative-leaning Orthodox meeting in Philadelphia. Of these, two have been laid down (Kansas Yearly Meeting, and Western Yearly Meeting) and two reunited with Gurneyite yearly meetings and Hicksite yearly meetings (Canada and New England); the undivided Philadelphia Yearly Meeting reunited with its Hicksite counterpart. In addition, most Primitive Friends communities at the beginning of the twentieth century in New York, New England, and Pennsylvania, had merged into other Quaker bodies by 1955. According to a website representing "Friends in Christ... a small group of Primitive Friends (Plain Quakers)" "plain" Quakers can today be found in the United Kingdom, in addition to some other countries." Ripley Quaker Meeting is a small group of Conservative Friends also located in the UK, who follow Ohio Yearly Meeting's Book of Discipline.

In the USA, three Conservative Friends Yearly Meetings remain as distinct Conservative Friends bodies in Ohio, North Carolina and Iowa; with Ohio Yearly Meeting (Conservative) being the most traditional Christian in belief and practice, of the three Conservative Friends Yearly Meetings; A small Conservative Friends remnant continues in some of the united yearly meetings (Canada and New England). In Europe, there are Conservative Quaker groups in the United Kingdom, while individual members reside in other countries too.

As of 2019, the Ohio Yearly Meeting includes affiliated local meetings in Michigan, Ohio, Pennsylvania, Virginia, West Virginia, and Athens, Greece. The Iowa Yearly Meeting includes affiliated local meetings in Iowa, Minnesota, Missouri, Nebraska, South Dakota, and Wisconsin. According to the 2010 US Religious Census, there were 1,976 Conservative Friends in 40 congregations.

== See also ==
- Whittier Friends Meeting House, Whittier, Iowa, historic meetinghouse of a Conservative Wilburite Friends group
