= John Wilbur (Quaker minister) =

American Quaker minister (1774–1856)

John Wilbur (July 17, 1774 – May 1, 1856) was a prominent American Quaker minister and religious thinker who was at the forefront of a controversy that led to "the second split" in the Religious Society of Friends in the United States.

Wilbur was born to Quaker parents in Hopkinton, Rhode Island. Wilbur was recognized as an Elder in 1802 and acknowledged as a minister in 1812. Always intellectually inclined, Wilbur was the teacher of the local Friends school for many years. In 1822, Wilbur was appointed to an important committee of New England Friends to investigate the "new light" movement in Lynn, Massachusetts. He made a handful of travels in the ministry, for which he became known as an exponent of traditional Quakerism.

In 1831, Wilbur went on his first trip to England and encountered a growing Evangelical thrust among the Friends there, which made him uneasy. Friends had already come through a schism a few years earlier involving Elias Hicks. During this British trip, Wilbur wrote a series of letters to George Crossfield; these letters were well-received statements of Quaker doctrine and have been in print continuously since that time.

The main body of Friends were called Orthodox because they had remained orthodox in terms of Christianity. But now Wilbur believed that some Orthodox Friends, especially those in England, were so alarmed about Hicks's perceived heterodoxy that they had gone too far in the other direction. He saw that this group of Friends was abandoning the traditional Friends practice of following God's immediate, inward guidance in favor of using their own reason to interpret and follow the Bible. They were stressing a cold intellectual acceptance of the Bible instead of a vital, direct experience of the Holy Spirit in one's heart. Wilbur quoted early Friends, such as Isaac Penington, Robert Barclay, William Penn, and George Fox to make his case that the traditional view of Friends was that the inward light takes priority over the text of the Bible. At the same time, he agreed that the Bible was inspired by God and was useful as a guide, as had the early Friends.

Wilbur returned to the United States in 1833. He became embroiled in a dispute with Joseph John Gurney, a Quaker minister from England who was speaking throughout the United States. Gurney had been heavily involved in the drafting of the London Yearly Meeting's epistle in 1836. In that epistle Friends in England officially voiced their adoption of the more Evangelical views that Wilbur had encountered and disapproved. During Gurney's sojourn in the United States, Wilbur made private comments against Gurney's views to some of his associates in New England Yearly Meeting (which encompassed Friends in the eastern 80% of New England) and acquaintances in Philadelphia Yearly Meeting.

In 1838 some members of New England Yearly Meeting accused Wilbur of making derogatory statements against Gurney in violation of the principle of handling conflicts by going through the proper channels. They ordered South Kingston Monthly Meeting (local body he belonged to) to discipline him, but the local Friends supported Wilbur. Then the Rhode Island Quarterly Meeting (an intermediary group) laid down (dissolved) the South Kingston Monthly Meeting and attached its members to the Greenwich Monthly Meeting. The latter meeting disowned Wilbur in 1843. This disownment was confirmed by his quarterly meeting and then by the yearly meeting as well.

Wilbur continued in the Friends movement with the support of many like-minded members. In 1845, a division took place in New England over the unusual treatment of Wilbur and his supporters. The smaller body, comprising about five hundred members, came to be called the "Wilburites" for their support of John Wilbur. The larger body came to be called the "Gurneyites" for their support of Joseph J. Gurney. In succeeding years, other yearly meetings divided: New York in 1846 and Ohio, Indiana, and Baltimore in 1854. The Wilburite Friends later entered into fellowship with a branch called the Conservative Friends.

Wilbur made a second journey to England in 1853–1854. He died in 1856, the same year that two other leading Wilburite Quakers died (Thomas B. Gould and Job Otis).
