= New Foundation Fellowship =

Christian Quaker ministry

The New Foundation Fellowship is a Christian Quaker ministry, based in the United Kingdom and in the United States. It exists to reacquaint people with the Full Gospel Message that was preached by George Fox and the Early Friends. This Christian Quaker work is carried out by publishing articles and periodicals, and pamphlets and books; by publishing Christian Quaker materials on the internet; and by organising Christian Quaker meetings and gatherings in name of Jesus, holding solely to the belief that 'Christ Has Come To Teach His People Himself.'
