= 1641 =

1641 in various calendars
- Gregorian calendar: 1641; MDCXLI
- Ab urbe condita: 2394
- Armenian calendar: 1090; ԹՎ ՌՂ
- Assyrian calendar: 6391
- Balinese saka calendar: 1562–1563
- Bengali calendar: 1047–1048
- Berber calendar: 2591
- English Regnal year: 16 Cha. 1 – 17 Cha. 1
- Buddhist calendar: 2185
- Burmese calendar: 1003
- Byzantine calendar: 7149–7150
- Chinese calendar: 庚辰年 (Metal Dragon); 4338 or 4131 — to — 辛巳年 (Metal Snake); 4339 or 4132
- Coptic calendar: 1357–1358
- Discordian calendar: 2807
- Ethiopian calendar: 1633–1634
- Hebrew calendar: 5401–5402
- Hindu calendars
- Vikram Samvat: 1697–1698
- Shaka Samvat: 1562–1563
- Kali Yuga: 4741–4742
- Holocene calendar: 11641
- Igbo calendar: 641–642
- Iranian calendar: 1019–1020
- Islamic calendar: 1050–1051
- Japanese calendar: Kan'ei 18 (寛永１８年)
- Javanese calendar: 1562–1563
- Julian calendar: Gregorian minus 10 days
- Korean calendar: 3974
- Minguo calendar: 271 before ROC 民前271年
- Nanakshahi calendar: 173
- Thai solar calendar: 2183–2184
- Tibetan calendar: ལྕགས་ཕོ་འབྲུག་ལོ་ (male Iron-Dragon); 1767 or 1386 or 614 — to — ལྕགས་མོ་སྦྲུལ་ལོ་ (female Iron-Snake); 1768 or 1387 or 615

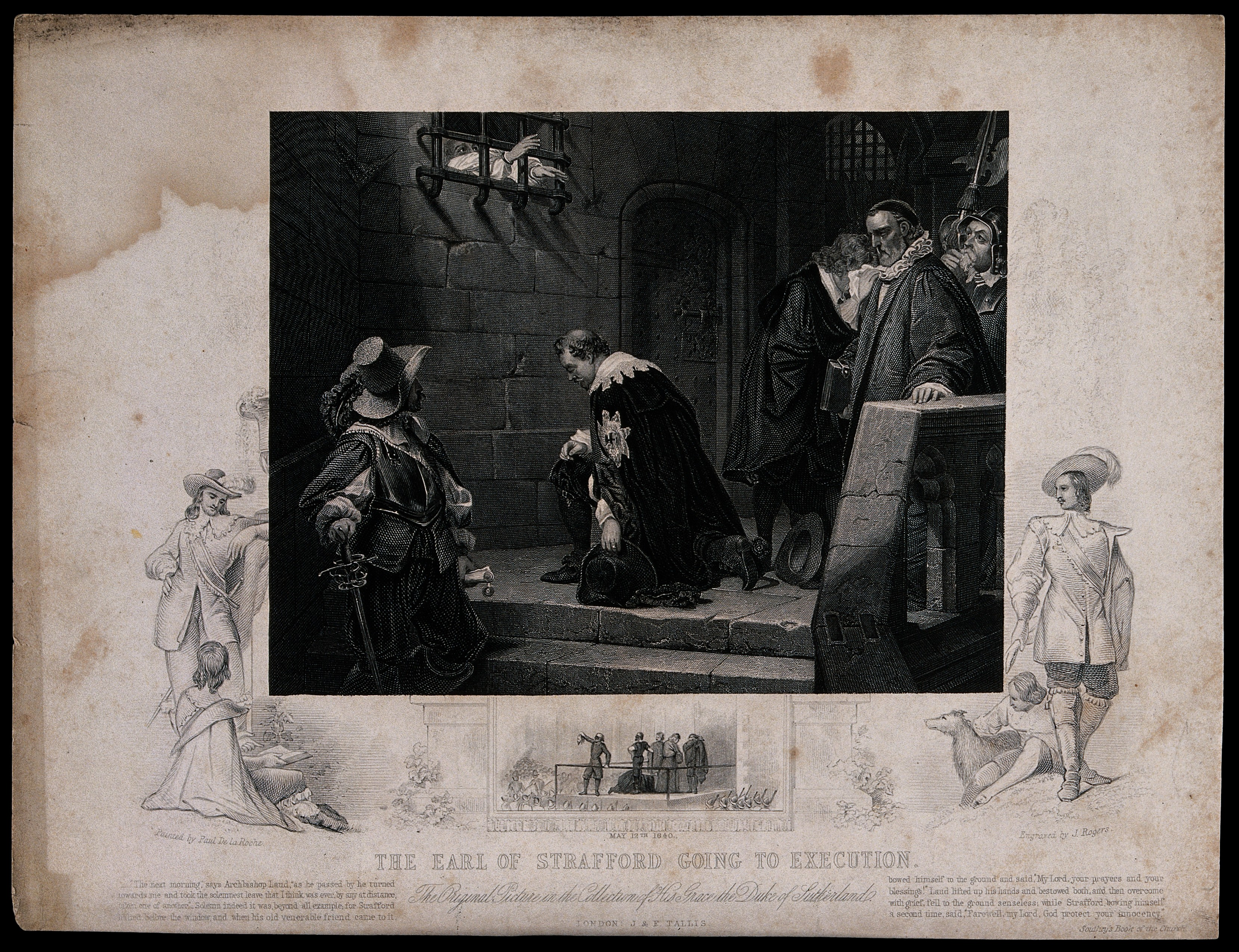
May 12: The Earl of Strafford is executed in London.

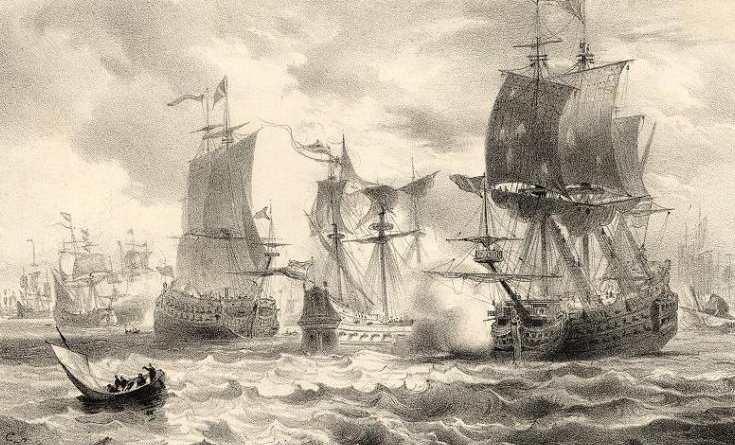
November 4: Battle of Cape St. Vincent

1641 (MDCXLI) was a common year starting on Tuesday of the Gregorian calendar and a common year starting on Friday of the Julian calendar, the 1641st year of the Common Era (CE) and Anno Domini (AD) designations, the 641st year of the 2nd millennium, the 41st year of the 17th century, and the 2nd year of the 1640s decade. As of the start of 1641, the Gregorian calendar was 10 days ahead of the Julian calendar, which remained in localized use until 1923.

== Events ==
=== January–March ===
- January 4 – The stratovolcano Mount Parker in the Philippines has a major eruption.
- January 14 – The Battle of Malacca concludes with the Dutch East India Company ending Portuguese control of Malacca.
- January 18 – The Junta de Braços (council of Estates) of the Principality of Catalonia, led by Pau Claris, accepts the proposal to establish the Catalan Republic under French protection.
- February 16 – King Charles I of England gives his assent to the Triennial Act 1640, reluctantly committing himself to parliamentary sessions of at least fifty days, every three years.
- March 7 – King Charles I of England decrees that all Roman Catholic priests must leave England by April 7 or face being arrested and treated as traitors.
- March 22 – The trial for high treason begins for Thomas Wentworth, 1st Earl of Strafford, director of England's Council of the North.
- March 27
  - The Battle of Pressnitz begins between the Holy Roman Empire and Sweden.
  - The Siege of São Filipe begins in the Azores as the Portuguese Navy fights to drive the Spanish out. After almost 11 months, the Portuguese prevail on March 4, 1642.

=== April–June ===
- April 7 – The deadline for Catholic priests to leave England expires. Among those who refuse to leave, Ambrose Barlow and William Ward become martyrs. Barlow surrenders on Easter Sunday, April 25, and is hanged on September 10; he will be canonized as a saint in 1970. Ward is caught on July 15 and executed on July 26.
- April 15 – Aegidius Ursinus de Vivere is appointed by Pope Urban VIII to be the Roman Catholic Church's Patriarch of Jerusalem.
- April 21 – England's House of Commons votes 204 to 59 in favor of the conviction for treason and the execution of the Earl of Strafford, and the House of Lords acquiesces. King Charles refuses to give the necessary royal assent.
- April 25 – The Battle of Songjin begins in the modern-day North Korean city of Kimch'aek, at the time part of the Chinese Empire controlled by the Ming dynasty. The Ming, led by General Wu Sangui, defeat the Qing rebels.
- April 30 – In Morocco, rebel leader and secessionist Sidi al-Ayachi is assassinated.
- May 3 – The Protestation of 1641 is passed by England's Parliament, requiring all officeholders to swear an oath of allegiance to King Charles I and to the Church of England.
- May 7 – England's House of Lords votes, 51 to 9, in favor of the execution of the Earl of Strafford for treason. In fear for his own safety, King Charles I signs Strafford's death warrant on May 10.
- May 11 – The Long Parliament in England passes the "Act against Dissolving Parliament without its own Consent".
- May 12 – Thomas Wentworth, 1st Earl of Strafford, former director of England's Council of the North, is publicly beheaded in London in front of a crowd of thousands of people.
- May 24 – Providence Island in the Caribbean, settled by English Puritans and a haven for English pirates off the coast of modern-day Colombia, is captured in a joint operation of the Spanish Navy in an attack led by Don Francisco Díaz Pimienta, and the Portuguese Navy led by the Count of Castel-Melhor Sousa. The expedition takes 770 prisoners, 380 slaves and a fortune in plundered gold and silver.
- June 1 – In Paris, representatives of Portugal and France sign a treaty of alliance.
- June 2 – Bavarian and Spanish troops capture the town of Bad Kreuznach during the Thirty Years' War, 17 months after it had been taken in a French and Saxon attack.
- June 12
  - In India, in the modern-day Rajasthan state, the Mughal Grand Vizier Abu'l-Hasan Asaf Khan is killed in a battle in Bundi against the armies of Nurpur, commanded by the Raja Jagat Singh. The elaborate Tomb of Asif Khan is constructed at Lahore (modern Pakistan) on orders of the Mughal Emperor Jahangir.
  - The Treaty of The Hague is signed between representatives of the Dutch Republic and the Kingdom of Portugal as a 10-year truce and alliance.
- June 29 – The Battle of Wolfenbüttel takes place between a combined Swedish and French force against the Holy Roman Empire, with the Swedish-French Army driving back an Imperial assault.

=== July–September ===
- July 5 – In England, the Long Parliament abolishes the Court of Star Chamber.
- July 12 – Portugal and the Dutch Republic sign a Treaty of Offensive and Defensive Alliance at The Hague. The treaty is not respected by both parties, and as a consequence has no effect in the Portuguese colonies (Brazil and Angola) that are under Dutch rule.
- August 10 – Charles I of England signs the Treaty of London ending the Bishops' Wars between England and Scotland.
- September 14 – The Treaty of Péronne is signed between Honoré II, Prince of Monaco and France's King Louis XIII, guaranteeing the Grimaldi family the right to rule Monaco in return for the principality becoming a French protectorate.
- September 18
  - In Germany, the Siege of Dorsten by the Holy Roman Empire ends after nine weeks with the surrender of the Landgraviate of Hesse-Kassel after the Hessians suffer 1,350 casualties.
  - In France, the siege of Bapaume ends with the surrender of the fortress by its Spanish occupiers.
- September 23 – The English ship Merchant Royal sinks off Cornwall along with its cargo of 100,000 pounds (45,000 kg) of gold and 18 of its 58 crew. More than 380 years later, treasure seekers will still not have located the wreckage.

=== October–December ===
- October 2 – Scottish politician John Campbell takes office as Lord Chancellor of Scotland and is given the title of the Earl of Loudoun by Charles I in his capacity as King of Scotland.
- October 23 – Irish Rebellion of 1641 breaks out: Irish Catholic gentry, chiefly in Ulster, revolt against the English administration and Scottish settlers in Ireland.
- October 24 – The Irish rebel Sir Felim O'Neill of Kinard issues the Proclamation of Dungannon.
- November 4 – Battle of Cape St Vincent: A Dutch fleet, with Michiel de Ruyter as third in command, beats back a Spanish-Dunkirker fleet off the coast of Portugal.
- November 22 – By a vote of 159 to 148, the Long Parliament of England passes the Grand Remonstrance, with 204 specific objections to King Charles I's absolutist tendencies, and calling for the King to expel all Anglican bishops from the House of Lords.
- December 1 – The English Parliament presents the Grand Remonstrance to King Charles, who makes no response to it until Parliament has the document published and released to the general public.
- December 7 – The bill for the Militia Ordinance is introduced by Arthur Haselrig, an anti-monarchist member of the House of Commons, proposing for the first time to allow Parliament to appoint its own military commanders without royal approval. King Charles, concerned that the legislation would allow parliament to create its own army, orders Haselrig arrested for treason. Parliament passes the Militia Ordinance on March 15.
- December 10 ‐ The Massachusetts Bay Colony adopts the Body of Liberties which was the first legal code in New England. Among its provisions, it made witchcraft a capital crime and also banned animal cruelty.
- December 16 – Pope Urban VIII announces the creation of 12 new cardinals of the Roman Catholic Church.
- December 23 – King Charles replies to the Grand Remonstrance and refuses the demand for the removal of bishops from the House of Lords. Rioting breaks out in Westminster after the King's refusal is announced, and the 12 Anglican bishops stop attending meetings of the Lords.
- December 27 – According to a journalist who witnesses the events, John Rushworth, the term "roundhead" is first used to describe supporters of the English Parliament who have challenged the authority of the monarchy. Rushworth writes later that during a riot on the 27th, one of the rioters, David Hide, draws his sword and, describing the short haircuts of the anti-monarchists, says that he would "cut the throat of those round-headed dogs that bawled against bishops."
- December 30 – At the request of King Charles, John Williams, the Anglican Archbishop of York joins with 11 other bishops in disputing the legality of any legislation passed by the House of Lords during the time that the bishops were excluded. The House of Commons passes a resolution to have the 12 bishops arrested. King Charles, in turn, issues an order on January 3 to have five members of the House of Commons arrested for treason.

=== Date unknown ===
- The Norwegian city of Kristiansand is founded by King Christian IV of Denmark-Norway.
- The Dutch found a trading colony on Dejima, near Nagasaki, Japan.
- Moses Amyraut's De l'elevation de la foy et de l'abaissement de la raison en la creance des mysteres de la religion is published.
- René Descartes' Meditations on First Philosophy is originally published.
- The town of Falun, Sweden is given city rights by Queen Kristina.
- A massive epidemic breaks out in northern and central China, just three years before the fall of the Ming dynasty. It races south down along the Grand Canal of China and the densely populated settlements there, from the northern terminus at Beijing, to the fertile Jiangnan region. In some local areas and towns it wipes out 90% of the local populace.

== Births ==
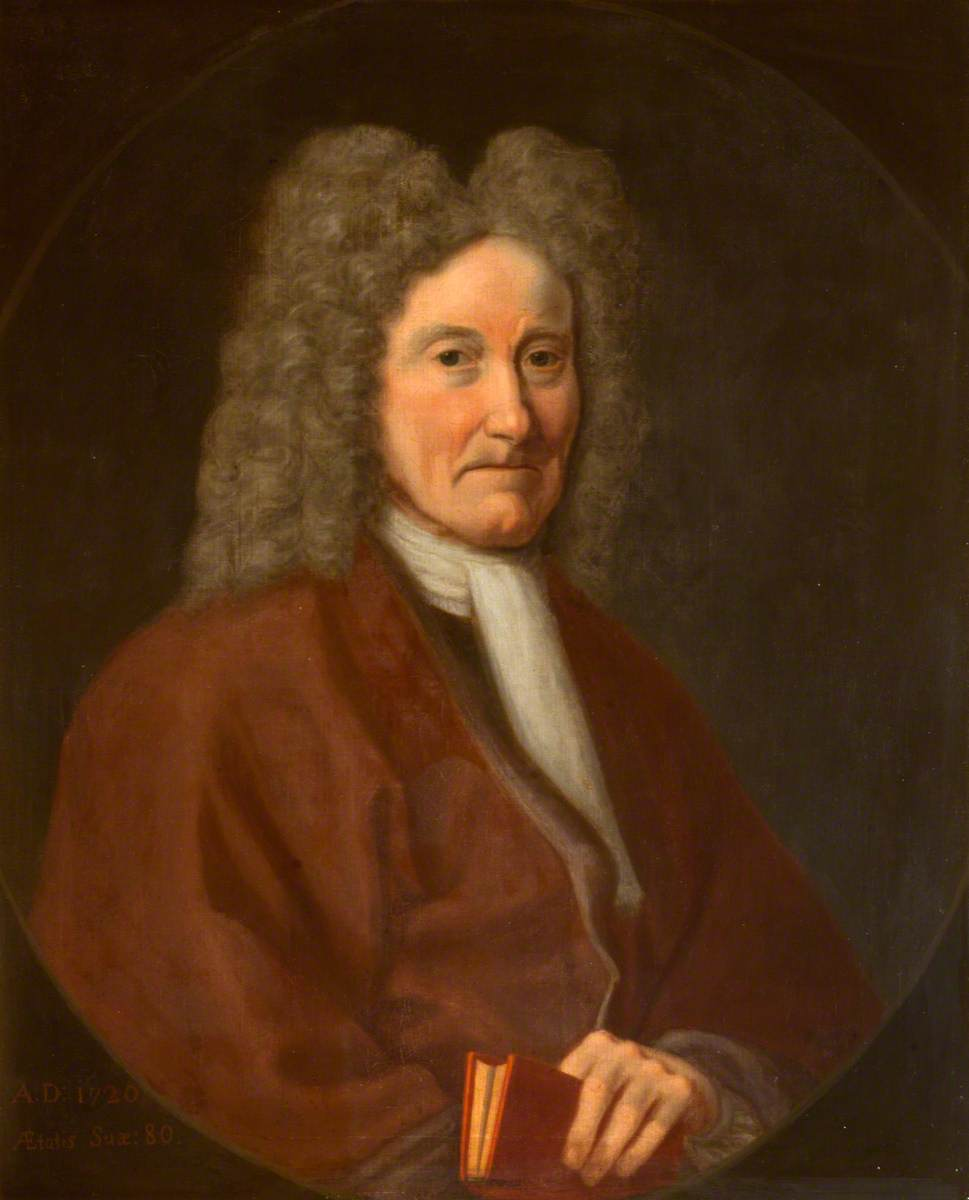
Robert Sibbald

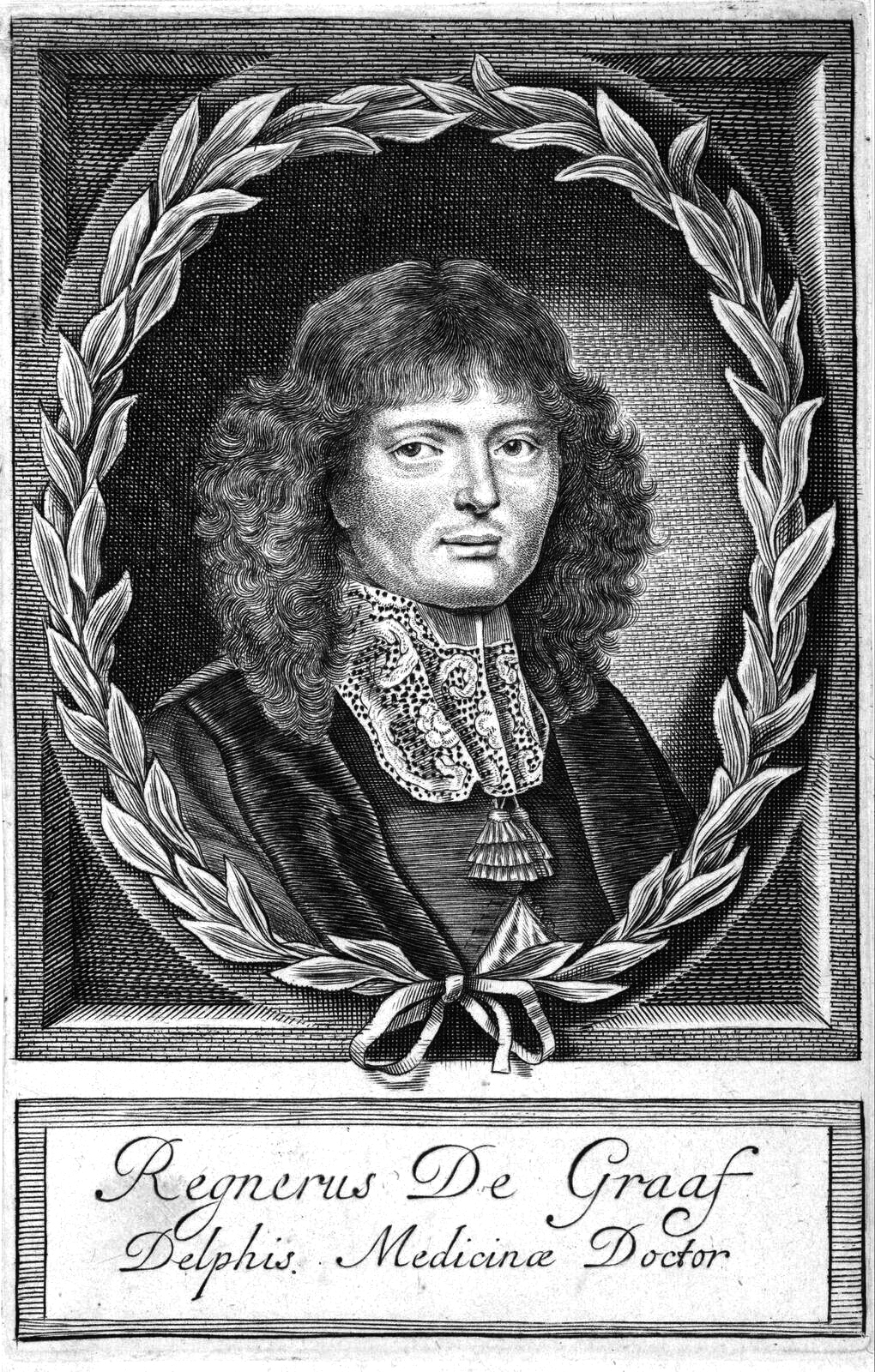
Regnier de Graaf

Henri Arnaud

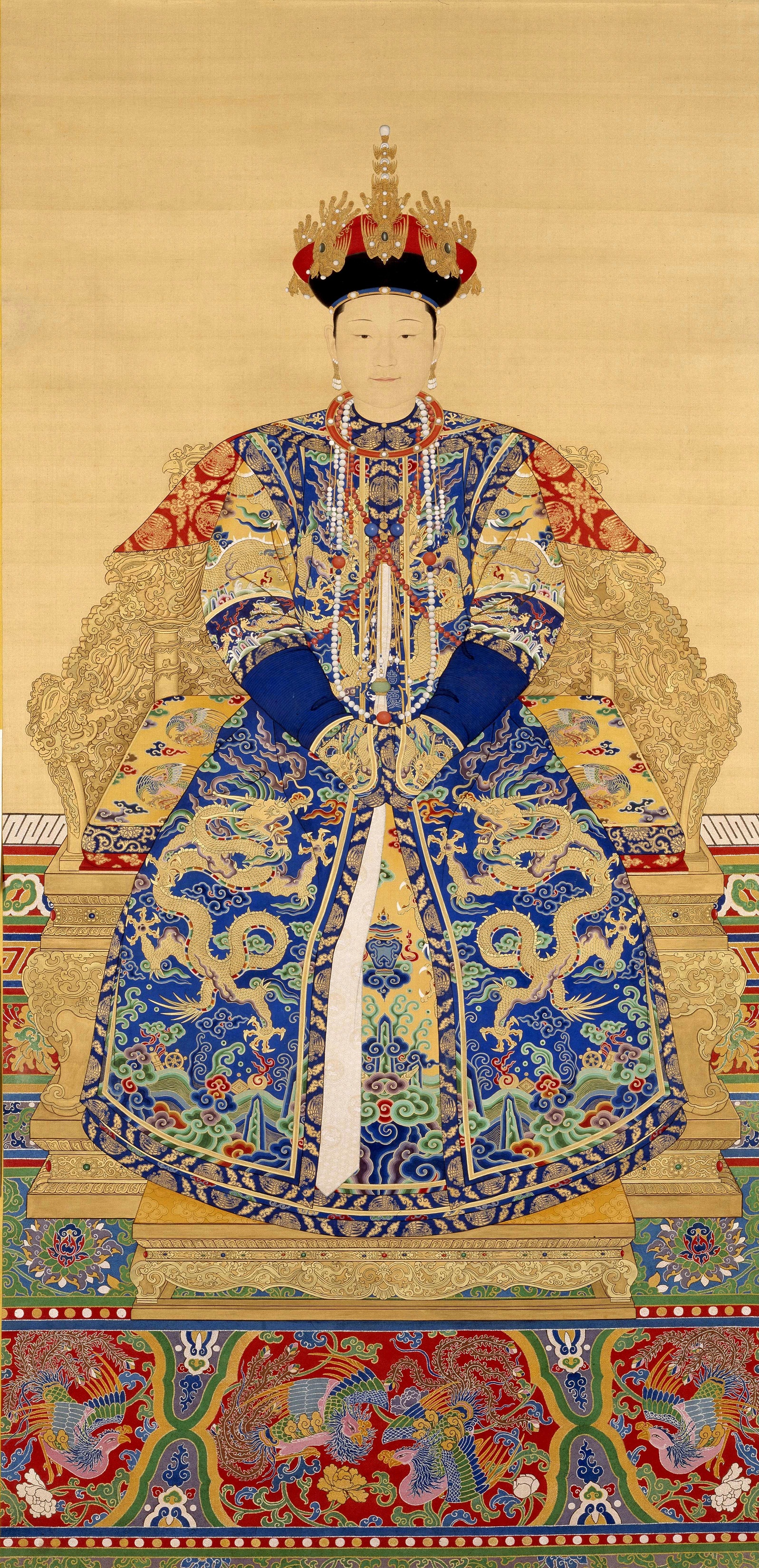
Empress Xiaohuizhang

=== January–March ===
- January 6 – Wolfgang Dietrich of Castell-Remlingen, German nobleman (d. 1709)
- January 13 – Patrick Hume, 1st Earl of Marchmont, Scottish statesman (d. 1724)
- January 18 – François-Michel le Tellier, Marquis de Louvois, French war minister (d. 1691)
- February 2 – Claude de la Colombière, French Jesuit priest and saint (d. 1682)
- February 3 – Christian Albert, Duke of Holstein-Gottorp, Duke of Schleswig-Holstein-Gottorp (1659–1695) (d. 1695)
- February 4 – Jerolim Kavanjin, Croatian poet (d. 1714)
- February 8
  - Richard Jones, 1st Earl of Ranelagh, Irish politician (d. 1712)
  - Robert Knox, English sea captain in the service of the British East India Company (d. 1720)
- February 24 – Gabriel Tammelin, Lutheran clergyman (d. 1695)
- March 14 – Hyeonjong of Joseon, 18th monarch of the Korean Joseon Dynasty (d. 1674)
- March 19 – Abd al-Ghani al-Nabulsi, Muslim scholar (d. 1731)
- March 29 – Johann Zahn, 17th-century German author of Oculus Artificialis Teledioptricus Sive Telescopium (d. 1707)

=== April–June ===
- April 4 – Sir James Oxenden, 2nd Baronet, English politician (d. 1708)
- April 8
  - Henry Sydney, 1st Earl of Romney, English politician and army officer (d. 1704)
  - (bapt.) – William Wycherley, English playwright (d. 1716)
- April 15 – Robert Sibbald, Scottish physician and antiquarian (d. 1722)
- May – Juan Núñez de la Peña, Spanish historian (d. 1721)
- May 8 – Nicolaes Witsen, Mayor of Amsterdam, Netherlands (d. 1717)
- May 16 – Dudley North, English economist, merchant and politician (d. 1691)
- May 17 – Pierre Monier, French painter (d. 1703)
- May 18 – Olimpia Giustiniani, Italian noblewoman (d. 1729)
- May 28 – Johann Weikhard von Valvasor, Slovenian polymath (d. 1693)
- May 31 – Patriarch Dositheos II of Jerusalem, Greek Orthodox Patriarch (d. 1707)
- June 15 – Bernard de la Monnoye, French lawyer (d. 1728)
- June 19 – Jan Claus, leading Quaker in Amsterdam (d. 1729)
- June 28 – Marie Casimire Louise de La Grange d'Arquien, French-born Polish consort to King John III Sobieski (d. 1716)
- June 29 – Pierre Cholonec, French Jesuit missionary and biographer in New France (d. 1723)
- June 30 – Meinhardt Schomberg, 3rd Duke of Schomberg, English general (d. 1719)

=== July–September ===
- July 9 – Jan Jansen Bleecker, Mayor of Albany, New York (d. 1732)
- July 13 – Juan de Santiago y León Garabito, Spanish Catholic prelate, Bishop of Guadalajara and Bishop of Puerto Rico (d. 1694)
- July 14 – William Boynton, English politician (d. 1689)
- July 29 – Sir William Thomas, 1st Baronet, English Member of Parliament (d. 1706)
- July 30 – Regnier de Graaf, Dutch physician and anatomist (d. 1673)
- August – John Hathorne, American magistrate (d. 1717)
- August 2 – Jacob Bobart the Younger, English botanist (d. 1719)
- August 3 – Hildebrand Alington, 5th Baron Alington, Irish peer (d. 1723)
- August 28 – Henry, Prince of Nassau-Dillenburg (1662–1701) (d. 1701)
- September 1 – Jean Barbier d'Aucour, French lawyer and satirist (d. 1694)
- September 5 – Robert Spencer, 2nd Earl of Sunderland, English diplomat (d. 1702)
- September 7 – Tokugawa Ietsuna, Japanese Tokugawa shōgun (d. 1680)
- September 16 – Julius Francis, Duke of Saxe-Lauenburg, Bohemian noble (d. 1689)
- September 20 – Henri Arnaud, pastor of the Waldensians in Piedmont (d. 1721)
- September 22 – Titus van Rijn, Dutch art dealer (d. 1668)
- September 26 – Nehemiah Grew, English plant anatomist and physiologist (d. 1712)

=== October–December ===
- October 1 – Hans Adam von Schöning, German general (d. 1696)
- October 5 – Françoise-Athénaïs de Rochechouart de Mortemart, mistress of Louis XIV (d. 1707)
- October 6 – Sir William Maynard, 1st Baronet, English politician (d. 1685)
- October 10 – Wolfgang Printz, German composer (d. 1717)
- October 14
  - Dorothea Maria of Saxe-Weimar, Duchess of Saxe-Zeitz, by marriage Duchess of Saxe-Zeitz (d. 1675)
  - Joachim Tielke, German musical instrument maker (d. 1719)
- October 28 – Philip Skippon, English naturalist and Member of Parliament (d. 1691)
- November 5 – Empress Xiaohuizhang, Qing Dynasty empress and consort of the Shunzhi Emperor of China (d. 1718)
- November 10 – Edward Lake, English churchman (d. 1704)
- November 14 – Albert Anton, Prince of Schwarzburg-Rudolstadt (1662–1710) (d. 1710)
- November 17 – André, marquis de Nesmond, French naval commander (d. 1702)
- November 23 – Anthonie Heinsius, Dutch statesman (d. 1720)
- December 7 – Louis, Count of Armagnac, French noble (d. 1718)
- December 11 – Jean-Louis Bergeret, holder of the 8th seat of the Académie française (d. 1694)
- December 20 – Urban Hjärne, Swedish chemist (d. 1724)
- December 29 – Pier Simone Fanelli, Italian painter (d. 1703)
- date unknown
  - Pierre Allix, French Protestant clergyman (d. 1717)
  - Diego Ladrón de Guevara, viceroy of Peru (d. 1718)
  - Dodo von Knyphausen, German nobleman (d. 1698)

== Deaths ==
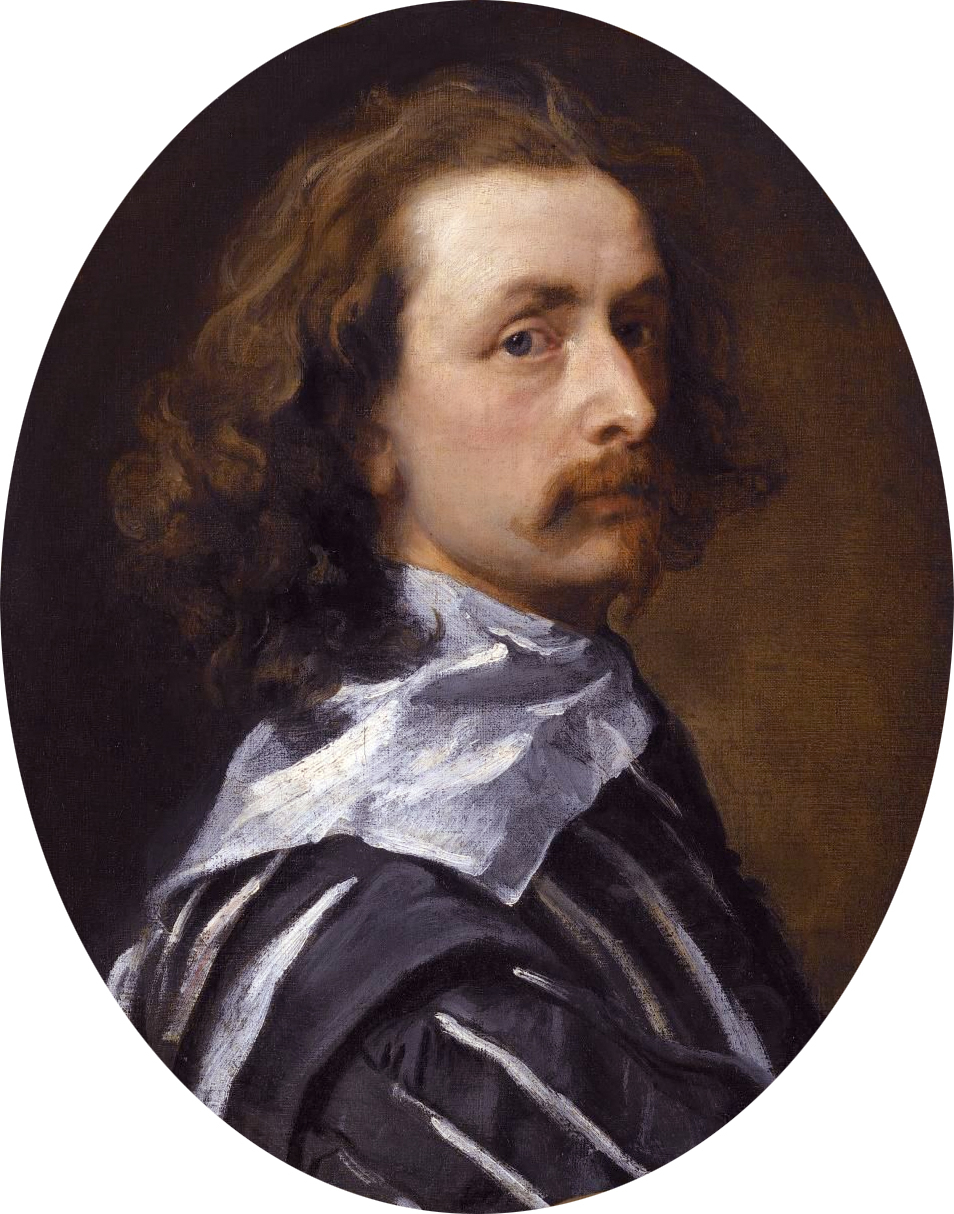
Anthony van Dyck

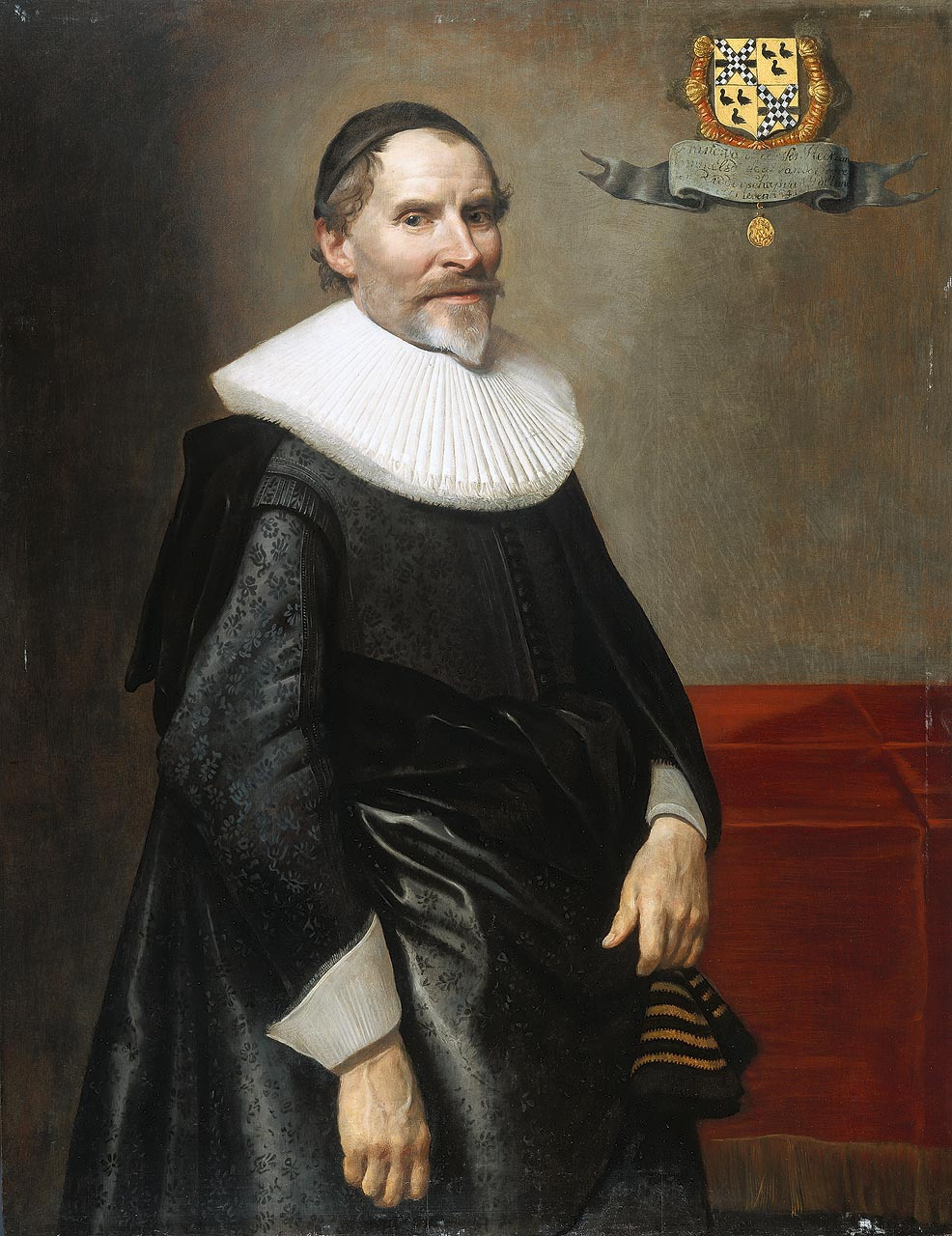
Francis van Aarssens

- January 3 – Jeremiah Horrocks, English astronomer (b. c. 1618)
- January 9 – Gustavus Adolphus of the Palatinate, German noble (b. 1632)
- January 11
  - Juan de Jáuregui, Spanish poet and painter (b. 1583)
  - Franciscus Gomarus, Dutch theologian (b. 1563)
- February 15 – Sara Copia Sullam, Italian poet and writer (b. 1592)
- February 17 – Krisztina Nyáry, Hungarian noblewoman (b. 1604)
- February 24 – Francesco Usper, Italian composer (b. 1561)
- February 27 – Pau Claris i Casademunt, Catalan ecclesiastic (b. 1586)
- March 8 – Xu Xiake, Chinese adventurer and geographer (b. 1587)
- March 14 – Adam, Count of Schwarzenberg, German politician (b. 1583)
- March 23 – Claude Bernard, French priest (b. 1588)
- April 6 – Domenico Zampieri (Domenichino), Italian painter (b. 1581)
- April 13 – Richard Montagu, English clergyman (b. 1577)
- April 27 – Wilhelm von Rath, German soldier and scholar (b. 1585)
- May 10 – Johan Banér, Swedish soldier (b. 1596)
- May 12 – Thomas Wentworth, 1st Earl of Strafford, English statesman (b. 1593)
- June 1 – Carlo Emanuele Pio di Savoia, Italian Catholic cardinal (b. 1585)
- June 17 – Emirgûneoğlu Yusuf Paşa, Ottoman grand vizier (b. 1605)
- July 4
  - István Esterházy Hungarian noble (b. 1616)
  - Pedro Teixeira, Portuguese explorer
- July 6
  - Livia della Rovere, Italian noble (b. 1585)
  - Louis, Count of Soissons (b. 1604)
- July 8 – Balthasar I Moretus, Flemish printer (b. 1574)
- July 13 – Nicolaes le Febure, Dutch Golden Age member of the Haarlem schutterij (b. 1589)
- July 21 – Thomas Mun, English writer on economics (b. 1571)
- July 24 – Giovanni Francesco Guidi di Bagno, Italian cardinal (b. 1578)
- August 4 – Otto III, Duke of Brunswick-Harburg (b. 1572)
- August 9 – Augustine Baker, Welsh Benedictine mystic (b. 1575)
- August 16 – Thomas Heywood, English playwright (b. c. 1573)
- August 26 – Jean-Jacques Bouchard, 17th-century French writer (b. 1606)
- September 10 – Ambrose Barlow, English Catholic martyr (b. 1585) (executed)
- September 12 – John Upton, English politician (b. 1590)
- October 3 – Étienne Martellange, French architect (b. 1569)
- October 31 – Cornelis Jol, Dutch naval commander and privateer (b. 1597)
- November 9
  - Cardinal-Infante Ferdinand of Austria, Governor of the Netherlands and Bishop of Toledo (b. c. 1609)
  - Maren Spliid, Danish alleged witch (b. c. 1600) (executed)
- November 11 – Christopher Clitherow, Lord Mayor of London and Member of Parliament (b. 1578)
- November 12 – Philipp Ludwig III, Count of Hanau-Münzenberg (1638–1641) (b. 1632)
- November 26 – Hedwig of Denmark, Danish princess (b. 1581)
- December 3 – John Percy, English priest (b. 1569)
- December 9 – Sir Anthony van Dyck, Flemish painter (b. 1599)
- December 22 – Maximilien de Béthune, Duke of Sully, 2nd Prime Minister of France (b. 1560)
- December 27 – Francis van Aarssens, Dutch diplomat (b. 1572)

=== Date unknown ===
- Estêvão de Brito, Portuguese composer (b. c. 1570)
- Arthur Johnston, Scottish physician and poet (b. c. 1579)
- Mukai Shogen Tadakatsu, Japanese admiral (b. 1582)
- Harjol, Chinese concubine of Hong Taiji (b. 1609)
