= Quakers in Europe =

Religious movement in Europe

The Quaker movement began in England in the 17th century. Small Quaker groups were planted in various places across Europe during this early period (For instance, see the Stephen Crisp article). Quakers in Europe outside Britain and Ireland are not very numerous although new groups have started in the former Soviet Union and successor countries. By far the largest national grouping of Quakers in Europe is in Britain. As of 2017, there were around 32,100 Quakers (Friends) in Europe.

== By Country ==
=== Albania ===
In 2017, there were 380 Friends in Albania within its one Evangelical (Gurneyite) meeting.

=== Belgium and Luxembourg ===
Quaker Meetings are held in Brussels and Luxembourg, with occasional meetings in Antwerp and Ghent. The first Meeting for Business was held in Brussels in March 1975. As of 2017, there were 106 Friends in the combined Monthly Meeting.

==== Quaker Council for European Affairs ====
The Quaker Council for European Affairs (QCEA) is an international not-for-profit organisation which seeks to promote the values and political concerns of the Religious Society of Friends (Quakers) at the European level. It undertakes research and advocacy in the fields of peacebuilding and human rights policy, notably in relation to the European Union and the Council of Europe. Founded in 1979 by Quakers who worked in the European institutions, it is based in Brussels, Belgium, and is registered under Belgian law.

==== Quaker House Brussels ====
Quaker House, located on the Square Ambiorix, Brussels, was acquired shortly after QCEA's foundation. Quaker House Brussels serves as the main Meeting House for Quakers in Belgium and Luxembourg. The building itself, built in the 1890s by the architect Georges Hobé, is a well-preserved example of Art Nouveau architecture and has protected heritage status.

=== Britain ===
There were 23,067 Quakers in the United Kingdom in 2017. There are 70 Area Meetings in Britain and 470 Local Meetings. The vast majority of British Quakers attend Meetings of unprogrammed worship.

Well-known British Quakers: See: List of British Quakers

=== Croatia ===
There were 50 Evangelical (Gurneyite) Friends in Croatia in 2017.

=== Denmark ===
In 2017, there were 30 Danish Friends in one Yearly Meeting.

=== Finland ===
In 2017, there were 30 Finnish Friends in one Yearly Meeting.

=== France ===
Well-known French Quakers include: Ferdinand Barlow, Stephen Grellet and Jeanne Henriette Louis.

In 2017, there was one Yearly Meeting in France made up of 160 Friends.

=== Georgia ===
Friends House Georgia operates in Tbilisi and has provided humanitarian assistance to refugees from the Russian invasion.

=== Germany ===
Well-known German Quakers include: Elisabeth Abegg, Annot, John William Gerard de Brahm, Hans Einstein, Carl Hermann, John Theodore Merz, Marcello Pirani, and Gerhart von Schulze-Gävernitz.

The German Yearly Meeting is for both Germany and Austria. The meeting consisted of 453 Friends in 2017.

=== Hungary ===
As of 2017, there were 4,012 Hungarian Friends in two meetings, including one Evangelical (Gurneyite) meeting.

=== Ireland ===
There were 2,046 Friends in Ireland in 2017. In addition to the main Ireland Yearly Meeting, there is one Evangelical meeting.

=== Italy ===
Pier Cesare Bori was a well-known Italian Quaker.

There were only 16 Friends in Italy as of 2017 in two meetings, one being in Rome.

=== Netherlands ===
==== Seventeenth century ====
Quakers first arrived in the Netherlands in 1655 when the nephew of William Ames and Margaret Fell, William Caton, took up residence in Amsterdam. The Netherlands were seen by Quakers as a refuge from persecution in England and they perceived themselves to have affinities with the Dutch Collegiants and Mennonites who had sought sanctuary in the country. However, Quakers still encountered persecution similar to that from which they had hoped to escape in England. This did not prevent the start of preaching tours however, and in 1661, Ames and Caton visited the County Palatine of the Rhine and met with Charles I Louis, Elector Palatine at Heidelberg.

William Penn, the Quaker founder of Pennsylvania, had a maternal connection to the Netherlands and visited in 1671. He returned in 1677 with George Fox and Robert Barclay and at Walta Castle, their religious community at Wieuwerd in Friesland, he unsuccessfully tried to convert the similarly minded Labadists to Quakerism. The men also journeyed on the Rhine to Frankfurt, accompanied by the Amsterdam Quaker Jan Claus who was their translator. His brother, Jacob Claus, had Quaker books translated and published in Dutch and he later produced a map of Philadelphia.

==== Eighteenth century ====
The attraction of a life free from persecution in the New World led to a gradual Dutch Quaker migration. English Quakers in Rotterdam were permitted to transport people and cargo by ship to English colonies without restriction and throughout the 18th century many Dutch Quakers emigrated to Pennsylvania. There were an estimated 500 Quaker families in Amsterdam in 1710, but by 1797 there were only seven Quakers left in the city. Isabella Maria Gouda (1745–1832), a granddaughter of Jan Claus, took care of the meeting house on Keizersgracht, but was evicted shortly afterwards.

The Quaker presence disappeared from Dutch life by the early 1800s until its re-emergence the 1920s, with Netherlands Yearly Meeting established in 1931.

Well-known Dutch Quakers include: Kees Boeke, Jan Claus, Jan de Hartog, and William Sewel.

==== Present Day ====
In 2017, there were 115 Dutch Friends in one Yearly Meeting.

=== Norway ===
There is a vibrant history of Quakerism in Norway. Unlike in many other European countries Quaker communities survived migration and persecution for over three hundred years. Norway Yearly Meeting holds meetings in Bergen, Bø in Telemark, Kristiansand, Farsund, Mandal, Oslo, Stavanger, and Trondheim.

As of 2017, there were 200 Friends in the Norway Yearly Meeting.

==== Early beginnings ====
Quakers first visited Norway in the 1650s when Quaker faith was still in its infancy. British Quakers record a ship stranded in Bergen in 1666 which was deporting Quakers to British colonies. Laurence Fullove, one of the Quakers aboard the ship reports that tracts were handed out to curious citizens of Bergen. That same year, in 1666, the first Quaker tract in Danish and Norwegian was published: John Higgin's The Lord's Message to All Persons who confess their faith in God.

==== Nineteenth century ====
The Society of Friends in Norway started in 1814, with the highest concentration of Quakers living in and around Stavanger. In 1819, Quakers Knut and Anne Halvorsen had their marriage recognised and were allowed to reside in Norway. Other named Quakers were allowed to live in the Stavanger area by the Norwegian Royal Decrees of 1826 and 1828, on the condition that they reported births, deaths, and marriages to the authorities and did not proselytise. During this time two Quakers, Elias Tastad and Knut Halvorsen, were prosecuted for burying their deceased family members in un-consecrated soil. During the 1825 mass migration of Norwegians to America, the numbers of Norwegian Quakers in the country diminished by a third.

In 1846, the Society of Friends became the first officially registered and legal religious society outside the state church of Norway. It was not until 1956 that other groups (the Methodists and Lammers society) were registered in a similar way. Throughout the 1840s, Norwegian Quakers were subject to the Act Relating to Dissenters (1845), which was intended to keep dissenting groups in small, isolated pockets of Norwegian society. Despite this, Quakerism continued to spread, and new meeting houses were built in Kvinesdal, Sauda, Røldal, Skjold, and Tromsø during the 1840s. Still a relatively small population, Quakers numbered 473 in the 1865 census.

During the latter half of the nineteenth century, Quakers were very active in the Norwegian peace movement, which threatened their status as an organisation. After the Napoleonic wars, Norway maintained conscription, and a number of Norwegian Quakers were punished for conscientious objection. One of the first recorded Norwegian Quaker conscientious objectors, Soren Olsen, was lashed for three days in 1848. In a wider act of objection, in 1898 the clerk of Stavanger meeting refused to submit the names of Quaker conscripts to the local authorities.

In 1898, the Norwegian Society of Friends became a private religious organisation, which meant that the organisation was no longer subject to the act on dissenters. The society accepted new members and was able to continue to carry out funerals and marriages.

==== Twentieth century ====
In 1909, a group of Norwegian Friends attended London Yearly Meeting and in 1920, several Norwegian Friends attended the first worldwide conference of Friends. The peace testimonies prompted a new movement of collections and campaigning in Norway, which has continued to the present day. In 1937, Ole Olden established the periodical Kvekeren which was issued across Scandinavian countries.

During World War II a number of Norwegian Quakers, including Olden and Lund, were imprisoned by the occupying German forces for resistance work. Lund was active in the Norwegian underground movement protecting Norwegian Jews and refugees and in 1947 she became the first member of the Oslo Worship Group to become a Quaker. Olden was later nominated for the 1957 Nobel Peace Prize. Lindgrov School was established by Norwegian Friends in 1959, contributing ideas to national policies concerning training and work as aspects of care for people with learning disabilities. In 1975, a Monthly Meeting was established in Kristiansand.

==== Notable Quakers ====
Well-known Norwegian Quakers include Elise M. Boulding, Asbjørn Kloster, and Sigrid Helliesen Lund.

=== Poland ===
Quakers arrived in Poland during the Interwar period (1918–1939) to assist with humanitarian aid for the newly re-independent nation.

As of 2017, there were only 20 Polish Friends divided between three small meetings.

=== Romania ===
As of 2017, there were 920 Quakers in Romania, most of whom belonging to the Evangelical (Gurneyite) branch of Quakerism.

=== Russia ===
There are weekly Quaker meetings in Moscow (Monthly Meeting) and meetings by arrangement in St Petersburg. As of 2017, there were 26 Friends in Russia.

The history of Quakerism in Russia is long and diverse, with multiple references and obscure connections to British Quakerism throughout Russian history.

==== First Quakerism and Persecution ====
The first Quaker connection to Russia came in 1656 when British Quaker George Fox sent an epistle to the Tsar of Muscovy Aleksei Mikhailovich. In 1697, Peter the Great visited England as part of the Grand Embassy where he was presented with Barclay's Apology and other Quaker works. Peter met with William Penn and attended meetings for worship whilst in England. Despite these initial connections, during the latter seventeenth century in Russia, the name "Quaker" was one of a number of pejorative terms for religious individuals who challenged earthly powers in the name of personal experience of the divine. Records show that Quakers were prosecuted in Russia as early as 1689. Throughout the eighteenth century, religious dissenters called "Quaker maidens" were exiled to Siberia for their beliefs. In 1779, the Ecclesiastical Dictionary listed "Quakers" as "nothing else but crowds of deranged people and enthusiasts who are possessed".

Further formal Quaker contact with Russia came in the 1760s, when Empress Catherine II sought a physician to inoculate herself and her son against smallpox. Catherine sought the Quaker physician Thomas Dimsdale, who was subsequently recalled to Russia to inoculate Catherine's grandsons.

==== Nineteenth century ====
When Tsar Alexander I visited England in 1814 as one of the victors over Napoleonic France; the Quakers sought out the ruler as they had Peter I. Alexander's evangelical faith was not dissimilar to that of then-contemporary Friends: he "received them warmly, prayed with them, 'fully assented' to their peace testimony, and attended meetings for worship". He also invited Friends to visit his Empire, and subsequently welcomed Quaker visitors, notably William Allen, who worked in Russia to promote education and prison reform, and travelled among the many dissenting religious groups of Southern Russia. In 1817, the Russian government wished to drain marshlands near St Petersburg, and Alexander sent a request for a suitable specialist to the Society of Friends in Britain. Quakers Daniel Wheeler and his family responded to this call; they spent some thirty years reclaiming land near St Petersburg and introducing modern farming techniques. Daniel's wife Jane Wheeler died in Russia in 1832, and her daughter in 1837. In recognition of the Wheelers' services the Imperial government granted them in perpetuity the land in which the dead had been buried: the Quaker burial ground still exists at Shushary, close to the city.

In 1854, British Friends sent a mission to Emperor Nicholas I seeking, unsuccessfully, to avert the Crimean War. Later they worked with the great novelist and pacifist Leo Tolstoy and his followers. Tolstoy's daughter-in-law became a member of the Society.

An important facet of Quaker involvement with Russia which began at this time was war and famine relief, first carried out in the Russian Grand Duchy of Finland in the 1850s. This became a major area of work, and British and American Friends gave considerable help during the Volga famine of the 1890s.

==== Nineteenth century culture ====
The image of the Pietist "good Quaker" lingered in the Russian cultural imagination well into the nineteenth century and became especially noticeable in the second half of the reign of Alexander I, when the emperor was increasingly involved in mysticism. The view of the "good Quaker" marked a religious awakening, fully manifested in Russian Martinism, it found increased development in the 1820s.

Onegin, the protagonist of Alexander Pushkin's 1823 novel Eugene Onegin refers to the Quakers as one of a multitude of social guises he may adopt:

'Has he grown tame at last, and mellow? / Or does he follow his old bent / And as of yore play the odd fellow? / Pray whom now does he represent? / Would he be Melmoth or Childe Harold, / Or as a Quaker go appareled, / A bigot seem – a patriot – / A cosmopolitan – or what?'

Nikolai Leskov had an English Quaker aunt, who raised him until he was sixteen. Academics have remarked that Leskov's later adoption of Russian Orthodoxy was marked by a distinct rationalist ethics which can be attributed to his early Quakerism.

==== Twentieth century ====
During and after World War I, the revolutions and the Russian Civil War, Quakers worked with refugees and other victims of harvest failures, wars, and relocations to create feeding centres, hospitals, orphanages, schools, and cottage industries. Perhaps the best-known example of Quaker relief work in Russia was Friends' participation in the international response to the famine of 1921. In that year alone, British and American Friends fed 212,000 people.

The small Quaker office set up in Moscow in connection with these activities managed to maintain cooperation with the new Soviet authorities in the field of health through the 1920s, and survived until 1931. It became the last representative of any Western religious organisation in Moscow as Stalin tightened his grip on the Soviet Union.

A remarkable pictorial record survives from this period in the sketches made in 1923 by Richard Kilbey of Wells-next-the Sea Meeting, when he and his brother Ernest were relief workers in South-Eastern Russia, in the town of Buzuluk. One sketch shows the Quaker team arriving back on a sledge at the house headquarters of the Quaker unit. Across the road was a malaria clinic in a building showing the marks of recent fighting between Red and White units in the Civil War.

Under Stalin, Friends were able to make formal visits to the Soviet Union in 1930, 1948 and 1949; otherwise contacts were limited to a few unusual and energetic individuals. After World War II, from 1950 onwards, the British Friends' East-West Committee and the American Friends' Service Committee tried to expand links, with some success, especially under Khrushchev. With the advent of Perestroika contact became easier.

The present (2015) Moscow Monthly Meeting grew out of a small local group which began to meet in Moscow in the manner of Friends in the late 1980s. In 1983, Russian historian Tatiana Pavlova had come into contact with British Quakers. Over the next few years, occasional visits and meetings for worship gradually developed into a worship group initially hosted in Tatiana's apartment. After the fall of the Soviet Union the meeting outgrew her home; it moved to the basement of a Russian Orthodox church, later to a school, to the premises of Friends House Moscow, and eventually to larger and more public quarters. It is now (2015) the largest Quaker group in Russia.

The dissolution of the Soviet Union and the great hardships suffered by the Russian people in the 1990s offered new challenges to Western Friends. Moscow Representatives of Quaker Peace and Service (Britain) were re-appointed in 1991, and in 1992 Pacific Yearly Meeting (US) asked representatives to consider the Russian relationship. A few years later, Friends from Alaska Yearly Meeting began pastoral visits to their ethnic brothers and sisters in eastern Siberia, and American Friends participated in the material aid programme of the ecumenical Alaskan Friends of Chukotka. Friends House Moscow opened on 1 January 1996.

Well-known Russian Quakers include: Nikolai Leskov and Tatiana Pavlova (Historian at the Russian Academy of Sciences).

=== Serbia ===
In 2017, there were 50 Serbian Quakers in two worship groups, one being in Belgrade.

=== Sweden ===
As in all Scandinavian countries, there were Quaker settlements in Sweden from the 1660s well into the 1800s. Small groups of Friends are known to have existed in Sweden in the 19th century under the care of Norway Yearly Meeting. However, they were prohibited by the Swedish government during the nineteenth century, as no alternatives where allowed to the state church (the Church of Sweden). Sweden Yearly Meeting arose spontaneously from a small worship group which met during World War I. In 1937, a number of Swedish Quakers (including sv:Emilia Norlind) formed Sweden Yearly Meeting, which was recognised by the government as an independent religious society outside the State Church. Since 1956, Swedish Friends have had their own Meetinghouse in Stockholm called Kväkargården. About seventy kilometres Nirth of Stockholm, the rural Svartbäcken is used for general meetings for business, retreats and children's summer camps. Samfundsrådet, a general meeting for business, meets twice a year to carry on business between yearly meetings.

Notable Swedish Quakers include Emilia Fogelklou, Jeanna Oterdahl, Elin Wägner, Per Sundberg, and Gunnar Sundberg.

In 2017 there were 130 Friends in the Sweden Yearly Meeting.

=== Switzerland ===
Swiss Quakers hold a Monthly Meeting in Geneva, and there are records of Quaker meetings in Zurich, Basel, Bern, Biel/Bienne, Neuchâtel, Lausanne, Montreux and Romanshorn.

Quaker meetings in Switzerland began with individuals who discovered a close affinity to the spiritual quest and ideals of Quakers. They met through their involvement in peace and reconciliation, conscientious objection and service, and, not least, in the Civil Service Movement founded by Pierre Cérésole in the early 1920s. A number of them had been to the Quaker centre at Woodbrooke, in Birmingham, and were subsequently accepted as individual members of London Yearly Meeting. Swiss Quakers held their first annual meeting in Bern in 1934, and continued meeting annually under the umbrella of London Yearly Meeting on whose authority they depended for the admission of new members. In 1938 they acquired the right to admit their own members, and in November 1939 they were recognised as a Regional Meeting. An independent Switzerland Yearly Meeting came into being in 1947.

Well-known Swiss Quakers include: Pierre Ceresole, Adolphe Ferrière, Edmond Privat, Elisabeth Rotten, and Theophilus Waldmeier.

There were 181 Friends in the Switzerland Yearly Meeting in 2017.

=== Ukraine ===
In 2025 there were an estimated 20 Friends in Ukraine. Yurii Sheliazhenko is a famous Ukrainian Quaker.

== Pan-European Quaker Organisation ==
Cross-continental organisation has been central to the spread and establishment of Quakerism. The early Quakers were prolific in communication and dissemination of Quaker material, which led to a significant number of European countries having some kind of Quaker presence in the seventeenth century, even if small in number.

In 1693 William Penn wrote an essay entitled Towards the Present and Future Peace of Europe by the Establishment of a European Diet, Parliament or Estate. In this early tract, Penn wrote:

- Peace in Europe may be maintained by forming a Sovereign Parliament of the European states to collectively decide disputes and unite as one strength in enforcing decisions.
- All of the European states including Russia and Turkey should be included in the Diet with votes equivalent to the value of their territory.
- States will still maintain their sovereignty over their internal affairs.
- Bloodshed would be prevented, and towns and property not destroyed.
- There must be a sovereign impartial authority to settle disputes which is greater than the parties in conflict.
- Travel between the states would be free and easy, and personal friendships could develop between peoples of different countries.
- Princes would not have to marry for political and diplomatic reasons but could establish unions based on sincere love.

Since Penn's early attempts at proselytism for a pan-European organisation, (one of the earliest advocates for a unified Europe) numerous Quaker organisations were created to bring Quakers across Europe together.

In 1920, the first Worldwide Conference of Quakers was held in London, with 936 delegates in attendance from across the world. Subsequently, three organisations were established which continue to involve European Quakers to a great extent:

- Quaker United Nations Office in Geneva and New York (c. 1920)
- Friends World Committee for Consultation (1937)
- Quaker Council for European Affairs (1979)

Clerks of FWCC: Europe and Middle East.
Clerk	Date	Yearly Meeting
Regnar Halfden-Neilsen	1939–1948	Denmark
W. H. Marwick	1949–1952	Scotland
Norah Douglas	1953–1955	Northern Ireland
Sigrid H. Lund	1956–1963	Norway
Heinrich Carstens	1964–1970	West Germany
Gunnar Sundberg	1971–1973	Sweden
Madelaine Jequier	1974–1976	Switzerland
John Ward	1977–1985	Switzerland
Erica Vere	1986–1991	Britain
Ena McGeorge	1992–1996	Britain
Egil Hovdenak	1996–1997	Norway
Marianne Ijspeert	1998–1999	Netherlands
Anita Wuyts	2000–2006	Belgium
Marit Kromberg	Current	Norway

== See also ==
- Britain Yearly Meeting
- Yearly Meeting
- Quaker Council for European Affairs
- Quaker United Nations Office
