= Per Sundberg =

Per Sundberg may refer to:

- Per Sundberg (activist) (1889–1947), Swedish educator and peace activist
- Per Sundberg (fencer), (1949–2015), Swedish fencer
- Per B. Sundberg (born 1964), Swedish ceramic and glass artist
