= Quaker Council for European Affairs =

International non-profit organisation

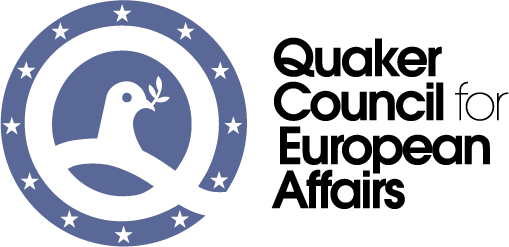
- Abbreviation: QCEA
- Formation: 1979 (47 years ago)
- Purpose: Peace; Human rights; Migration; Climate Justice
- Headquarters: Brussels, Belgium
- Region served: Europe
- Key people: Andrew de Sousa (director)
- Website: www.qcea.org

The Quaker Council for European Affairs (QCEA) is an international not-for-profit organisation which seeks to promote the values and political concerns of the Religious Society of Friends (Quakers) at the European level. It undertakes research and advocacy in the fields of peacebuilding and human rights policy, notably in relation to the European Union and the Council of Europe. Founded in 1979 by Quakers who worked in the European institutions, it is based in Brussels, Belgium, and is registered under Belgian law.

== Work and issues ==
QCEA undertakes policy research, political advocacy and "quiet diplomacy" on peacebuilding and human rights issues in the context of European politics. Its efforts currently focus on building support for nonviolent conflict resolution, shared security, and the human rights of refugees in Europe. In general, QCEA’s advocacy efforts focus on the European Union and the Council of Europe, where many of the political decisions relevant to its work are made.

More generally, QCEA argues in favour of peaceful cooperation between European countries, and in defence of the European human rights framework established after the Second World War. It hosts conferences and tours for Quakers from across Europe which explore these themes further.

Currently, QCEA works on three programme strands: migration and peace, climate justice and peace, and dialogues for transformation.

=== Inter-institutional cooperation ===
QCEA is a member of several civil society working groups and umbrella organisations in Brussels, including the European Peacebuilding Liaison Office, the Human Rights and Democracy Network, the Platform for International Cooperation on Undocumented Migrants (PICUM), The European Network Against Arms Trade (ENAAT) and the European NGO Platform on EU Asylum and Migration (EPAM). It also collaborates bilaterally with other NGOs on specific matters.

QCEA also possesses "participatory status" at the INGOs Conference of the Council of Europe, allowing it to contribute to the work of the Council in a formal capacity.

== Structure ==
QCEA is established as a non-profit association under Belgian law (association international sans but lucratif / internationale vereniging zonder winstoogmerk). Its ultimate decision-making body is its General Assembly, with a smaller Executive Committee empowered to make decisions.

Support groups, which fundraise for QCEA and also participate in its governance, have been established in Great Britain, the Netherlands and Ireland.

== History ==
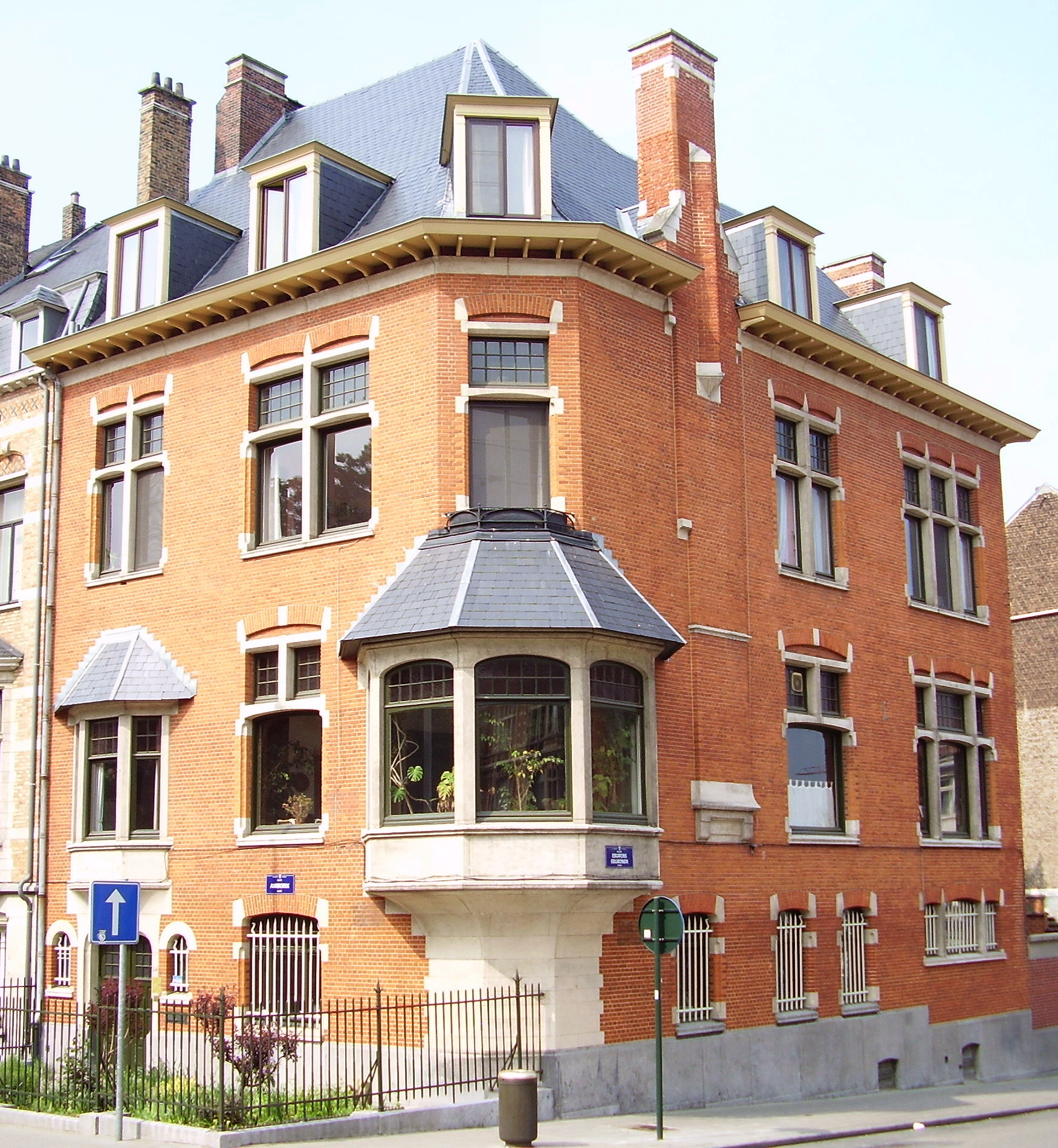
Quaker House in Brussels

A small, informal Quaker presence in Brussels was already in existence in the 1970s, consisting of both locals and foreign bureaucrats living in the city. Motivated by both the increasing international profile of Brussels and the linguistic schism taking place in Belgium at the time, steps were taken to formalise this presence from 1975 onwards.

The newly-established Brussels Monthly Meeting began issuing a regular newsletter, Around Europe, still published today, which rapidly became a source of updates on European political developments for Quakers around the world. This galvanised support for a "Quaker International Affairs Representative" to be posted in Brussels, as well as for an associated body to oversee their work. To that end, QCEA was established in September 1979.

=== Quaker House Brussels ===
QCEA’s offices are located in the European Quarter in Brussels, close to the EU institutions and Schuman metro station. They occupy a townhouse on Square Ambiorix which was acquired shortly after QCEA’s foundation; it also serves as the main Meeting House for Quakers in Belgium and Luxembourg. The building itself, built in the 1890s by the architect Georges Hobé, is a well-preserved example of art nouveau architecture and has protected heritage status.

== See also ==
- QUNO
- FWCC
- Quakers in Europe
- Britain Yearly Meeting
