= NGO Fractal =

Serbian nongovernmental organization

NGO Fractal is a non-governmental organisation from Serbia that works on improving communication and cooperation of people from different backgrounds. It is a think tank organisation that engages itself in the discussion of issues such as security, Serb-Albanian dialogues, energy, economy, self-advocacy and social-political problems; one of its aims is to help raise awareness about such topics worldwide.

NGO Fractal is a member of EPLO (European Peacebuilding Liaison Office), making it an internationally recognised non-governmental organisation whose origins are from Serbia.

== Background ==
NGO Fractal was founded by twelve people from different educational and professional backgrounds, and its current chairman is Filip Pavlović. It has been involved in numerous projects, most famous of which is Project Enclavia which concentrates on reintegrating the alienated Serbian population into everyday life in Kosovo.
