= Human Rights and Democracy Network =

The Human Rights and Democracy Network (HRDN) is an informal grouping of 43 NGOs operating at the EU-level in the broader areas of human rights, democracy and peacebuilding.The Human Rights and Democracy Network (HRDN) is an informal grouping of 43 NGOs operating at the EU-level in the broader areas of human rights, democracy and peacebuilding. It was created in 2004 and mainly operates in Brussels.

== Purpose ==
HRDN aims at influencing the EU and its Member States's policies and funding instruments to promote democracy, human rights and peace:

‘HRDN’s vision is that human rights and democracy are placed at the heart of the EU's internal and external policy agenda. This vision should manifest itself in an EU which effectively protects human rights at home and is a force for positive change in the world.’

== Activities ==
HRDN members gather once every six weeks in Brussels to exchange information and discuss potential joint advocacy activities, for instance the preparation and publication of common positions and recommendations. Activities are coordinated by a troika, whose representatives are elected among the member organisations during the annual meetings of the network.

To draft common positions or organise joint events, informal working groups are temporarily established. All member organisations of the network can join these working groups. Current policy working groups are focused on the following issues:

- the European Instrument for Democracy and Human Rights (EIDHR)
- the European Parliament

== Member Organisations ==
- Agir ensemble pour les droits de l'homme
- Amnesty International
- Association for the Prevention of Torture
- Christian Blind Mission
- Civil Rights Defenders
- Coalition for the International Criminal Court
- Conference of European Churches
- Christian Solidarity Worldwide
- CIDSE
- Club of Madrid
- DEMAS
- Euro-Mediterranean Human Rights Network
- European Association for the Defense of Human Rights (AEDH)
- European Partnership for Democracy
- European Peacebuilding Liaison Office
- Front Line Defenders
- Harm Reduction International
- Human Rights Watch
- Human Rights Without Frontiers
- ILGA-Europe
- International Centre for Transitional Justice
- International Dalit Solidarity Network
- FIACAT: International Federation of Action by Christians for the Abolition of Torture
- International Federation of Human Rights (FIDH)
- International Partnership for Human Rights
- International Rehabilitation Council for Torture Victims
- International Rescue Committee
- Justitia et Pax
- La Strada International Association
- Light for the World
- Minority Rights Group International
- Open Society Foundations
- Partners for Democratic Change International
- Peace Brigades International
- Penal Reform International
- Plan EU Office
- Protection International
- Quaker Council for European Affairs
- Reporters Without Borders
- Save the Children
- Search for Common Ground
- Terre des Hommes International Foundation
- World Coalition Against the Death Penalty
- World Organisation Against Torture (OMCT)
- World Vision International
