= La Strada International Association =

Organisation against human trafficking in Europe

La Strada International
- Abbreviation: LSI
- Formation: October 2004
- Purpose: Prevention of human trafficking
- Headquarters: Amsterdam
- Region served: Europe
- Main organ: General Assembly
- Website: lastradainternational.org

La Strada International (LSI) is an international non-governmental organization network addressing the trafficking of persons in Europe.

== Creation ==
La Strada International was created in October 2004, formalising an informal network that had existed since 1995. As of 2013, it included member organisations from Belarus, Bulgaria, Czech Republic, Macedonia, Moldova, the Netherlands, Poland, and Ukraine and an International Secretariat based in Amsterdam, the Netherlands. In each of the eight member countries the programme is implemented by independent human rights non-governmental organizations.

== Aims ==
LSI has an International Secretariat, whose main aims are information collection and research, with an online database for collating national-level data on individual cases and patterns of human trafficking; developing organisational capacity; and communicating in international organisations.

== Actions ==
In 2002, La Strada Ukraine, together with the Office for Democratic Institutions and Human Rights (ODIHR) of Organization for Security and Co-operation in Europe (OSCE), started a free national telephone hotline service in Ukraine for victims of human trafficking and for people planning on international travel and wanting advice on human trafficking risks.

== Networking ==
La Strada International is a member organisation of the NGO networks Global Alliance Against Traffic in Women, PICUM — the Platform for International Cooperation on Undocumented Migrants and the Human Rights and Democracy Network.

In July 2010, LSI was granted consultative status by the United Nations Economic and Social Council (ECOSOC). The consultative status gives LSI the ability to actively participate in the work of ECOSOC, as well as other bodies within the UN, such as the UN Secretariat. La Strada International will be allowed to consult with UN member states and discuss concerns and ideas within the field of human trafficking. LSI is also a member of OSCE Alliance Expert Coordination Team, the EU Fundamental Rights Agency Platform and has a participatory status with the Council of Europe.

LSI cooperates in anti-trafficking activities with EU and UN bodies. From 2009 to 2012 La Strada International, together with Anti-Slavery International implemented a three-year European project called "Comp.act". The aim of the project was to improve access to justice and guarantee compensation for trafficked people. The project received institutional support from the Council of Europe and OSCE/ODIHR.

In 2013, LSI began coordinating the La Strada NGO Platform, a network of 21 European (EU and non-EU) NGOs from 20 countries, working to address human trafficking, migration, labour rights, and sex work.

== See also ==
- Global Alliance Against Traffic in Women
- Polaris Project
- Coalition to Abolish Slavery and Trafficking
