= Global Alliance Against Traffic in Women =

Network of non-governmental organizations

- Abbreviation: GAATW
- Purpose: human trafficking, migration, human rights
- Headquarters: Bangkok
- Region served: Worldwide
- Main organ: International Board
- Website: gaatw.org

Global Alliance Against Traffic in Women (GAATW) is a network of more than 80 non-governmental organizations from all regions of the world that fight against trafficking in persons. GAATW is committed to work for changes in the political, economic, social, and legal systems and structures which contribute to the persistence of trafficking in persons and other human rights violations in the context of migratory movements for diverse purposes, including security of labour and livelihood. It was founded in 1994 by several activists.

== Method ==
GAATW applies a human rights approach to trafficking, which means:

- Centering the human rights of trafficked persons, and those in vulnerable situations, in all anti-trafficking activities;
- Acknowledging the equality of all persons to exercise, defend, and promote their inherent, universal, and indivisible human rights
- Non-discrimination on any grounds, including ethnic descent, age, sexual orientation or preference, religion, gender, age, nationality, and occupation (including work in the informal sectors such as domestic work, sex work, etc.)
- Primacy of the principles of accountability, participation, and inclusivity / non-discrimination in working methodologies, and organizational structures and procedures. In this respect, self-representation and organization of those directly affected by trafficking are strongly encouraged and supported.

== Activities ==
GAATW's work is structured around three main strategic thematic directions:

- accountability – which aims to increase the accountability of all anti-trafficking stakeholders involved in the design or implementation of anti-trafficking responses, towards the persons whose human rights they purport to protect.
- access to justice – which aims to broaden spaces for trafficked persons and migrant workers to practice their human rights by improving access to justice and combating all forms of discrimination that impact women's ability to exercise their human rights, as they relate to trafficking.
- power in migration and work – which centres an analysis of women's power in their labour and migration to better assess migration and labour policies' impact on women, and to work towards labour and migration processes that reflect migrants' needs, aspirations, and capabilities.

GAATW also serves its members through international advocacy, research, and strategic communications.

Publications by GAATW include:

- Trafficking in Women, Forced Labour, and Slavery-like Practices (1997) - the first worldwide investigation of human trafficking in the context of prostitution, marriage, and domestic labour
- Human Rights Standards for the Treatment of Trafficked Persons (1999) - a collection of human rights standards that can be used to protect trafficked persons' rights.
- Collateral Damage - The Impact of Anti-Trafficking Measures on Human Rights around the World (2007) - a research in eight countries across the globe, highlighting how anti-trafficking policies are routinely used to infringe on the human rights of groups of people, like women, migrants, and sex workers.
- What's the Cost of a Rumour? A guide to sorting out the myths and the facts about sporting events and trafficking (2011) - which challenged the wide-spread false belief that large sporting events lead to an increase in human trafficking.

Since 2015, GAATW publishes the Anti-Trafficking Review - an open access, peer-reviewed journal dedicated specifically to human trafficking. The journal's editor is GAATW advocacy officer Borislav Gerasimov. GAATW partnered with the Royal Society of Edinburgh in December 2019 to launch a special issue of Anti-Trafficking Review titled 'Public Perceptions and Responses to Human Trafficking'.

== See also ==
- La Strada Program
- Polaris Project
- Coalition to Abolish Slavery and Trafficking
