= Sydney D. Bailey =

American academic (1916–1995)

- Born: Sydney Dawson Bailey; 1 or 2 September 1916; Hull, England
- Died: 26 November 1995 (aged 79); London, England
- Known for: Pacifism; Studying the United Nations
- Spouse: Jennie Friedrich (m. 1945)
- Children: two

Sydney Dawson Bailey (1 or 2 September 1916 – 26 November 1995) was an English author, pacifist, and expert on international affairs. He worked at and was head of the Quaker United Nations Office during the 1950s. He was a conscientious objector during World War II, and spent several years in the Friends' Ambulance Unit. Bailey wrote 17 books and worked at the Carnegie Endowment for International Peace from 1958 to 1960 as a visiting scholar. He then left the endowment and was involved in various negotiations and advisory councils before his death in 1995.

== Biography ==
Sydney Dawson Bailey was born on 1 or 2 September 1916, in Hull, England, to Frank Burgess Bailey, a grain broker, and Elsie (May) Bailey, a teacher. He attended Worksop College, and left at the age of 15 or 16 and worked in various careers, including: at a bank, in a factory, and in insurance. When World War II began, Bailey was a conscientious objector, as he had become a dedicated pacifist. He served for six years in the Friends' Ambulance Unit, stationed in Burma and China from 1940 to 1946. While with the unit, he was infected with schistosomiasis, which Bailey would deal with for much of his life. It partially paralyzed him, and he would later use a wheelchair. He formally became a member of the Quakers while in China, and, upon returning to England, he married Jennie Elena Brenda Friedrich (1923-2021) on 26 April 1945. They had a son and daughter. For several years after the war ended, Bailey worked as a bank teller and then briefly in insurance. He also helped people left homeless by The Blitz. Bailey also edited the National News-Letter of Stephen King-Hall. From 1948 to 1954, he served as secretary of the Hansard Society.

Bailey taught himself political science and began to research parliamentary systems around the British Commonwealth, though his primary focus soon shifted to be on the United Nations Security Council and disarmament. From 1954 to 1958, Bailey and his wife worked at the Quaker United Nations Office in New York, and he was Quaker representative to the United Nations. After leaving the Quaker office, Bailey worked at the Carnegie Endowment for International Peace from 1958 to 1960 as a visiting scholar. As a peace negotiator, Bailey worked in various regions, including Ireland, South Africa and the Middle East. He traveled to the Soviet Union several times and worked at the Joseph Rowntree Charitable Trust. Bailey was also involved in the establishment of the International Institute for Strategic Studies and several other similar groups, including a lectureship at King's College London on ethical problems with war and the Council on Christian Approaches to Defence and Disarmament (CCAD). He worked to develop United Nations Security Council Resolution 242 in 1967. He also worked in internal affairs for the British Council of Churches and was a member of the Anglican Working Party.

From 1952 to 1976 Bailey organized several 10-day conferences, where diplomats from nations around the world met, notably including groups that "were not on talking terms" like the Arabs and Israelis. Bailey delivered the 1993 Swarthmore Lecture, titled "Peace is a Process". For his pacifist advocacy, Bailey was given the Rufus Jones Award by the World Academy of Art and Science. In 1985, he was granted a Doctor of Civil Law Lambeth degree by Lord Runcie, the Archbishop of Canterbury. Michael Quinlan considered Bailey "one of the most significant of" the moral critics of nuclear deterrence, because he understood "strategic realities of the Cold War". Bailey died on 26 November 1995, at his home in North London.

After his death, the CCAD established a fund in his memory, part of which went towards establishing the "Sydney Bailey Memorial Lecture", which was first given on 10 March 1997, by Prince Hassan bin Talal.

== Partial bibliography ==
- The procedure of the UN Security Council. Oxford [England]: Clarendon Press. 1975. ISBN 0-19-827199-9. OCLC 2866662.
- British parliamentary democracy. Westport, Connecticut: Greenwood Press. 1971. ISBN 0-313-20195-1. OCLC 3558976.
- The General Assembly of the United Nations; a study of procedure and practice. New York: Praeger. 1964. OCLC 505854.
- The Secretariat of the United Nations. New York: Carnegie Endowment for International Peace. 1962. OCLC 1673765.
- The United Nations: a short political guide. New York: Praeger. 1963. OCLC 710945.
- Voting in the Security Council. Bloomington: Indiana University Press. 1969. ISBN 978-0-253-36275-9. OCLC 61964.
- Prohibitions and restraints in war. London: Oxford University Press for the Royal Institute of International Affairs. 1972. ISBN 978-0-19-215196-4. OCLC 415892.
- Four Arab-Israeli wars and the peace process. New York: St. Martin's Press. 1990. ISBN 978-0-312-04649-1. OCLC 21039444.
- How wars end: the United Nations and the termination of armed conflict 1946-1964. Oxford; New York: Clarendon Press; Oxford University Press. 1982. ISBN 978-0-19-827424-7. OCLC 8170274.
- Peace is a Process (1993 Swarthmore Lecture). London: Quaker Home Service & Woodbrooke College. 1993. ISBN 0-85245-249-7.
- The UN Security Council and human rights. New York, N.Y.: St. Martin's Press. 1994. ISBN 978-0-312-12324-6. OCLC 30623807.

https://archive.org/details/peaceisprocess0000bail/page/n3/mode/2up
