= International Federation of Action by Christians for the Abolition of Torture =

International non-governmental organisation (NGO) for the defence of human rights

International Federation of ACATs
- International Federation of Action by Christians for the Abolition of Torture
- Fédération internationale des ACAT
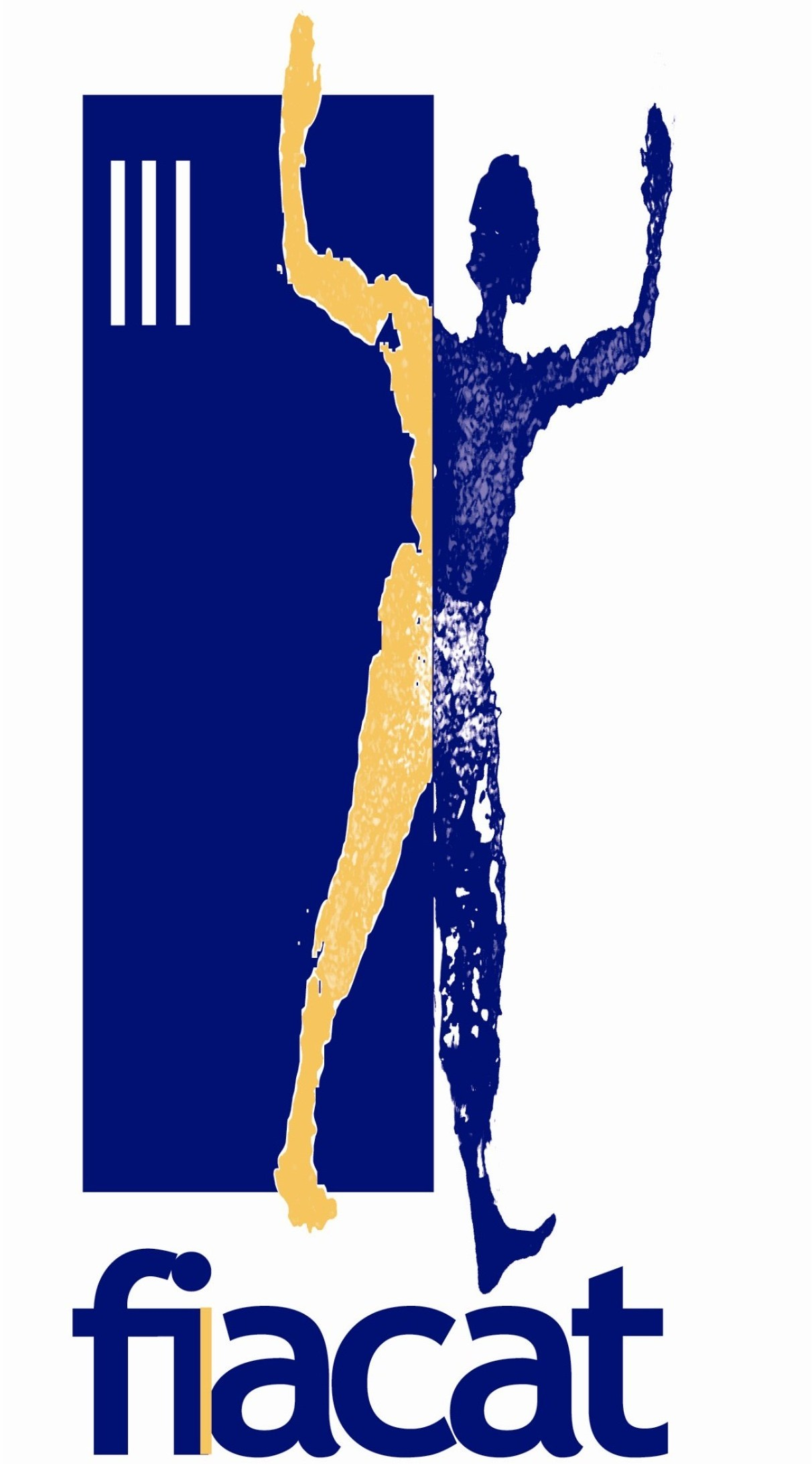
- Formation: 1987
- Type: International non-governmental organization
- Legal status: Association under the French law of 1901
- Headquarters: Vincennes
- Location: France
- Budget: €698 010 (2021)
- Website: https://fiacat.org/

The International Federation of ACATs (French: Fédération internationale des ACAT, FIACAT; fully International Federation of Action by Christians for the Abolition of Torture), is an international, non-governmental, Christian human rights organization, created in 1987, which fights for the abolition of torture and the death penalty.

The Federation brings together some thirty national associations. National associations, called Christian Actions for the Abolition of Torture (Actions chrétiennes pour l'abolition de la torture, ACATs), are present on four continents, and are intended to act on behalf of torture victims, detainees in inhumane conditions, prisoners sentenced to death, or those who have disappeared, regardless of their origins, political opinions, or religious beliefs.

FIACAT is run by an International Board of eight members from seven member organisations active in many countries.

FIACAT is a founding member of several action groups, including the World Coalition Against the Death Penalty, the Human Rights and Democracy Network, the French Human Rights Platform and the International Coalition Against Enforced Disappearances.

In December 2021, the Generalitat de Catalunya awarded FIACAT the Cassià Just Prize for its work in favour of human rights and the ecumenical nature of its work.

== Mandate ==
FIACAT is committed to the fight against torture and for the abolition of the death penalty throughout the world.

== International Representation ==
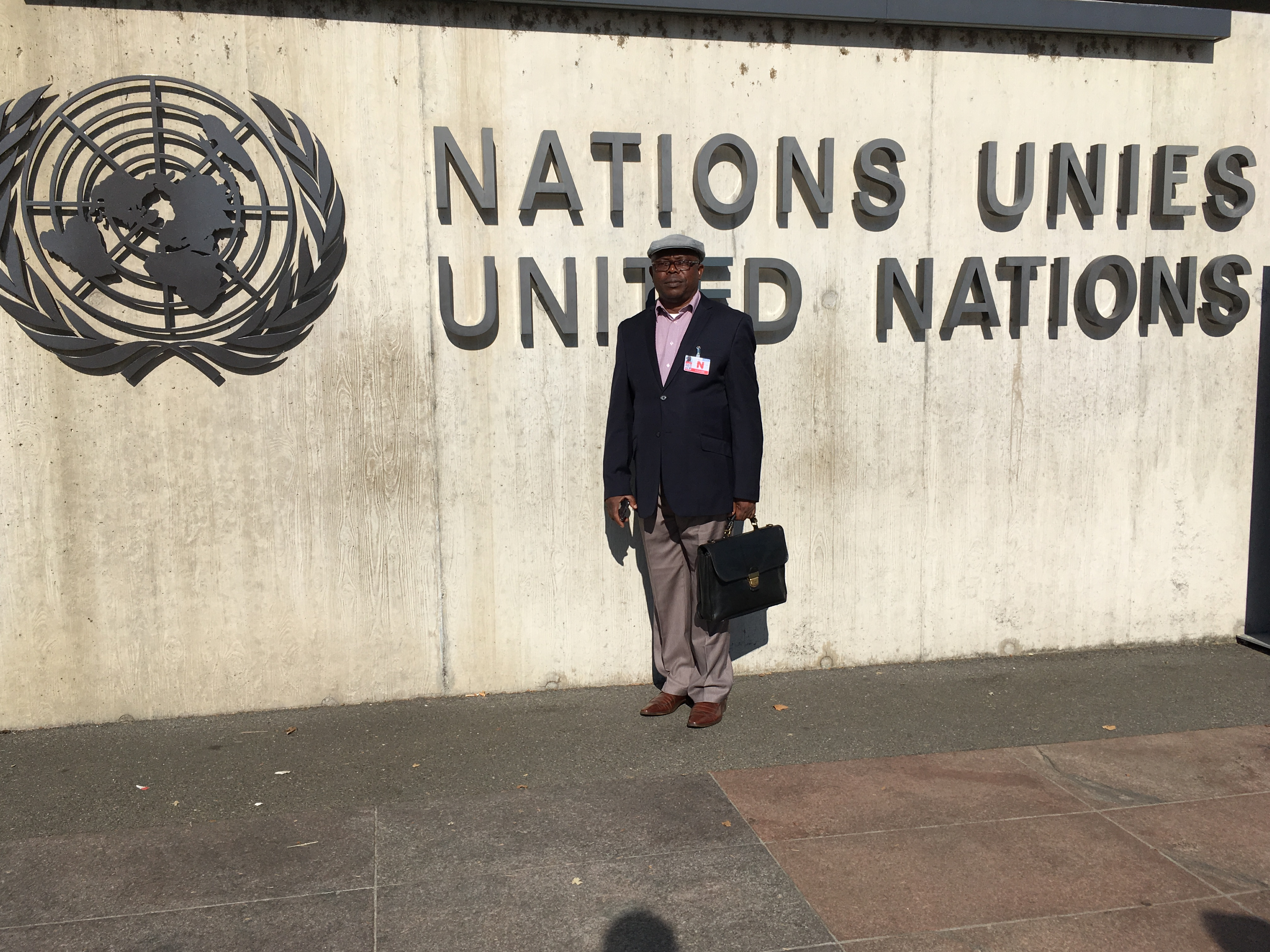
Member of ACAT Central African Republic at the United Nations headquarters in Geneva

FIACAT has consultative status with the United Nations, participatory status with the Council of Europe and observer status with the African Commission on Human and Peoples' Rights. FIACAT is also accredited to the International Organisation of the Francophonie.

FIACAT relays its members' concerns to international bodies. It aims at the adoption of relevant recommendations and their implementation by governments. FIACAT contributes to the application of international human rights conventions, to the prevention of torture in places where people are deprived of their liberty, to the fight against enforced disappearances and to the fight against impunity. It also participates in the fight against the death penalty by encouraging States to abolish this provision in their legislation.

== Capacity Building ==
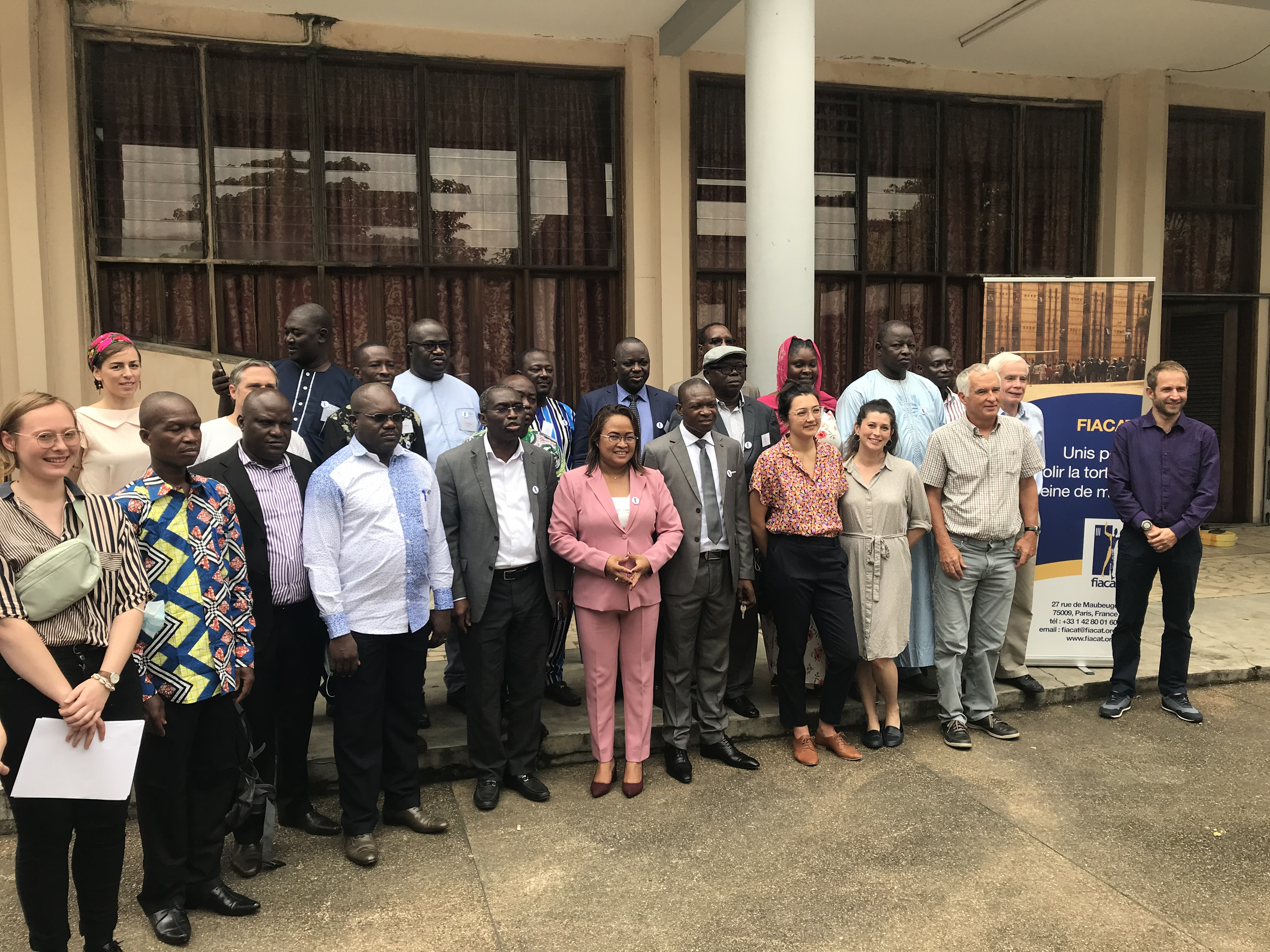
International Council of FIACAT in Abidjan (Ivory Coast)

FIACAT strengthens the capacities of member organisations by helping them to structure themselves. It supports the process of making ACATs important actors in civil society, capable of raising public awareness and having an impact on the authorities in their country. It helps to keep the network alive by encouraging exchanges, proposing regional or international training and joint intervention initiatives. FIACAT supports the actions of the ACATs and provides them with an international relay.

== Programs ==
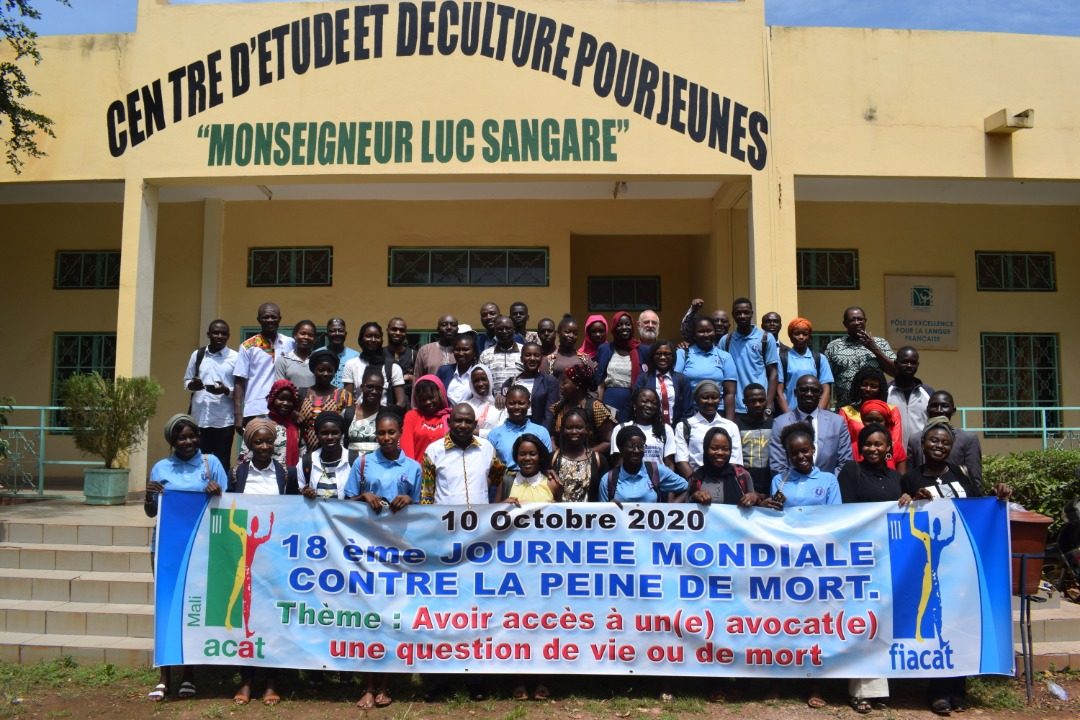
ACAT Mali event for the 18th World Day against the Death Penalty

=== Abolition of the Death Penalty in Africa ===
Since 2012, FIACAT has been conducting a joint programme with ACAT members in Africa to contribute to the abolition of the death penalty on the African continent and to accompany the abolitionist dynamic that has been observed on the continent since the 1990s.

This project, targeting 23 countries in sub-Saharan Africa, has been carried out jointly with the World Coalition Against the Death Penalty since 2015.

Today, majority of African countries are in favor of abolition. The latest to abolish the death penalty are Rwanda (2007), Burundi and Togo (2009), Gabon (2010), Benin (2012), Congo and Madagascar (2015), Guinea (2016 for ordinary crimes and 2017 for military crimes), Burkina Faso (2018), Chad (2020) and Sierra Leone (2021).

=== Combating Abusive Pre-trial Detention ===
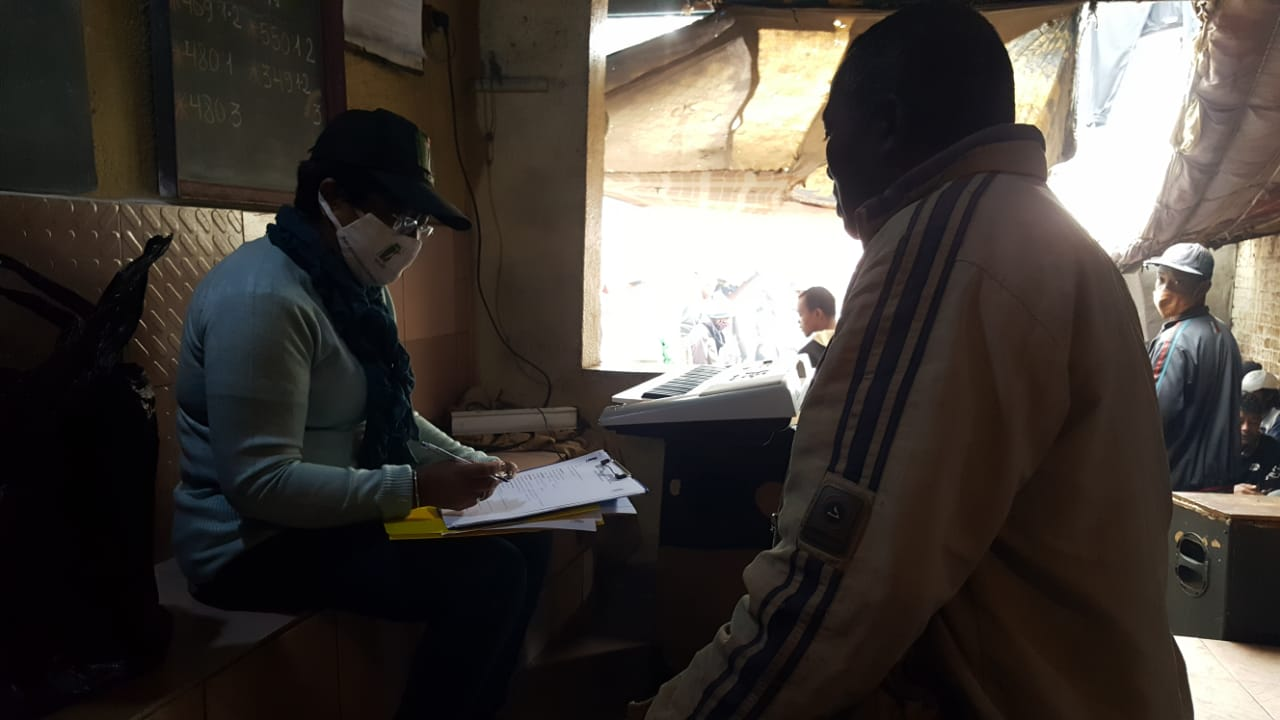
A volunteer from ACAT Madagascar during a visit to the Central House of Antanimora (Antananarivo)

Pre-trial detention is the confinement of a person before a final court decision has been taken. It constitutes an attack on the presumption of innocence and is considered as abusive preventive detention when the rules governing it are not respected.

Strengthened by their presence among the "forgotten" of justice, the ACAT partners of the project and FIACAT have decided since 2014 to fight against this phenomenon of abusive pre-trial detention in six countries (Benin, Côte d'Ivoire, Republic of Congo, Democratic Republic of Congo, Madagascar and Chad). This practice contributes to prison overcrowding, affects the conditions of detention and has a socio-economic impact on the defendants and their families.

FIACAT and its partner ACATs aim to reduce prison overcrowding by training judicial and prison staff and civil society. During prison visits, ACATs identify cases of pre-trial detention. The cases are followed up by referral lawyers, who provide legal support to ACAT members in the field, until the provisional or definitive release of those awaiting trial. Between 2014 and 2022, this programme has led to the identification of 7,216 cases of pre-trial detention and the obtaining of 4,762 court decisions among them.

In line with the federation's international representation role, FIACAT and the ACATs support the authorities in implementing the recommendations of regional and international organisations and raise awareness of prisoners' rights.
