= Coalition to Abolish Slavery and Trafficking =

U.S. non-profit organization

Coalition to Abolish Slavery and Trafficking (CAST) is a Los Angeles-based anti-human trafficking organization. Through legal, social, and advocacy services, CAST helps rehabilitate survivors of human trafficking, raises awareness, and affects legislation and public policy surrounding human trafficking.

CAST was founded in 1998 as a response to the landmark El Monte Thai Garment Slavery Case of 1995, in which 72 Thai immigrants were forced to work in slave-like conditions for 18-hours a day, while locked-up in the Los Angeles suburb of El Monte. The victims were paid about 69 cents an hour, and charged exorbitant amounts for basic necessities, ensuring they would never be able to pay off their original debt to their traffickers, and remain under their control. The case garnered national press coverage, and brought the issue of modern slavery and human trafficking into the mainstream media. In 1997, Dr. Kathryn McMahon, a professor at California State University, Long Beach, started the Trafficked Women Project. This grew into CAST, which officially came into existence in 1998.

CAST defines human trafficking as "a modern-day form of slavery", in which victims are subjected to force, fraud or coercion for the purpose of forced labor or sexual exploitation. Victims of trafficking can work in domestic service, factories, farms, restaurants, construction sites, hotel housekeeping, servile marriage, forced prostitution, child prostitution and child pornography.

According to their website, CAST has spearheaded many developments in the anti-trafficking movement. They are the first organization in the United States exclusively dedicated to serving survivors of trafficking, and were instrumental in starting the Los Angeles Slavery and Trafficking Task Force (now called the Los Angeles Metropolitan Task Force on Human Trafficking), the first task force in the U.S. dedicated to combating human trafficking. In 2004, CAST opened the country's first shelter exclusively housing survivors of human trafficking.

== Services ==
CAST's stated mission is to "assist persons trafficked for the purpose of forced labor and slavery-like practices and work toward ending all instances of such human rights violations. " The organization favors a survivor-centric approach, and achieves its mission by providing three main services: Advocacy and coalition building, client service programs, and outreach.

- Advocacy and Coalition Building – Through advocacy and coalition building, CAST campaigns to affect public policy and legislation surrounding the issue of human trafficking. CAST partners with other NGOs and law enforcement organizations, to foster a co-operative approach to combating trafficking.

CAST has influenced anti-trafficking legislation, including the Trafficking Victims Protection Reauthorization Act (TVPRA) of 2008, and the SB 1569 California bill in 2006, which allows for non-citizen victims of trafficking to gain access to state funded social services for up to one year.

- Client Services – CAST's client services are designed to meet the needs of survivors of human trafficking, and include legal representation, social services such as job training, counseling, life skills training, and provision of food and shelter. CAST started the first shelter in the U.S. that exclusively houses survivors of human trafficking.
- Outreach programs – CAST's outreach programs raise public awareness of the existence of human trafficking—focusing on how to identify victims of trafficking, and "ensure that they will be treated as victims rather than illegal aliens or even criminals." CAST provides training to law enforcement, health and social service providers, attorneys, government and faith-based organizations.

== Survivor Advisory Caucus ==
CAST's Survivor Advisory Caucus is made up of former CAST clients who have healed from their trafficking situations. Members of the caucus organize to speak publicly to raise awareness of human trafficking, and advocate for policy changes. Caucus members took part in the Border Governors Conference in 2008, led by California's First Lady Maria Shriver.

== Approach ==
CAST endorses low-risk activism. They do not encourage activists to take it upon themselves to "save a victim" on their own. CAST takes the approach that doing so can prove dangerous to the victim(s) and/or the individual(s) getting involved. Instead, they encourage individuals to get involved by becoming volunteers, advocating for the abolition of modern-day slavery, supporting CAST and other anti-trafficking initiatives through events, drives and fundraising campaigns, and reporting a potential case of trafficking by calling law enforcement, CAST, or the national trafficking hotline (1.888.3737.888).

== Partners ==
CAST helped launch Freedom Network USA, a national training and technical assistance project, with funding from the Department of Health & Human Services Office of Refugee Resettlement As of 2009, there are 29 member organizations from across the U.S. in this network

Locally, CAST partners with the Los Angeles Metropolitan Area Task Force on Human Trafficking, Southern California Partners for Social Justice, Sex Trafficking Outreach Project (STOP), Rescue and Restore Regional Outreach Program, and Sweat Free Advisory Group.

Internationally, CAST partners with the Humanity United Action Group, an organization that campaigns against mass atrocities and modern-day slavery, whose members include Free the Slaves, Polaris Project, Solidarity Center, the Ricky Martin Foundation, Not for Sale Campaign, ASSET campaign, Carlson Companies, Vital Voices, and the International Justice Mission.

== Statistics ==
- 27 million people are enslaved around the world today.
- Between 600,000 and 800,000 victims are trafficked through international borders every year, not including the estimated millions trafficked domestically within their own countries.
- Human Trafficking is a $9 billion industry.
- Human Trafficking ranks second, after drug smuggling, and tying with arms dealing, in organized crime activities, and is the fastest growing criminal enterprise in the 21st century.
- As many as 50,000 men, women and children are trafficked into the U.S. every year.
- The U.S. is one of the top three destination points for trafficked victims, along with Japan and Australia.
- Los Angeles is one of the top three points of entry in the U.S. for victims of slavery and trafficking.

== Legislation ==
Human trafficking has been subject to increasing national attention, eliciting legislation on the state and federal level. Listed below are some key legislations enacted to combat trafficking and support victims.

- Victims of Trafficking and Violence Protection Act of 2000 (US) – This is the most comprehensive U.S. law to date addressing human trafficking. Among other things, the law allows victims to apply for T-visas, which allow for three-year temporary stays which can lead to permanent residency status.
- Trafficking Victims Protection Reauthorization Acts of 2003, 2005, and 2008 (US) – These Acts enhanced protections for victims of trafficking, some of whom faced "unintended obstacles" in being able to legally remain in the U.S., and instituted revisions and additions to the prevention of trafficking and prosecution of traffickers.
- Assembly Bill 22 (Lieber) and Senate Bill 180 (Kuehl) – Both enacted in California 2006, these bills established a statewide task force (California Alliance to Combat Trafficking and Slavery), of which CAST is a member. Among other aspects, the bill provides for mandatory restitution and allows trafficking victims to bring a civil action against their traffickers.
- Senate Bill 1569 (Kuehl) – Put into effect in 2007, this bill gives victims of trafficking access to state-funded medical, social service and cash assistance programs for up to one year.

== Involvement ==
CAST has a comprehensive but selective volunteer program, which provides training and education about the best practices for working with victims of trafficking.

== The Evolution of Survivor Leadership Programs ==
In the years since the Survivor Advisory Caucus was established, CAST has expanded its survivor leadership programs and developed organized networks such as Resilient Voices and the National Survivor Network. In addition to peer support, these programs focus on leadership training, public policy engagement, public speaking, and survivor representation in legislative processes. CAST has introduced this model as an approach to directly involving survivors with lived experience in the design of anti-trafficking policies and services.

== Current and former Board members ==
- Sr. Catherine Marie Kreta, CSJ
- Kevin R. Davis
- Rachel J. Lee
- Sal Varela
- Dr. Kathryn McMahon
- Chancee Martorell
- Julie Thompson
- Keely O'Callaghan
- Molly Rhodes
- Liliana T. Pérez
- Kay Buck

== See also ==
- La Strada Program
- Polaris Project
- Global Alliance Against Traffic in Women
