= Treaty of The Hague (1641) =

1641 ten-year truce between the Dutch Republic and Portugal

The Treaty of The Hague of 1641 was a ten-year truce between the Dutch Republic and the Kingdom of Portugal. It was also a "Treaty of Offensive and Defensive Alliance" between the two countries. The treaty included a pledge to form a combined fleet to attack Spain. The truce, which was originally meant to apply to all of the territories of the two empires, was, in practice, limited to the European continent.

== Historical context ==
The Dutch declared their independence from the Habsburg king of Spain in 1579, which resulted in war. In 1580, the Iberian Union, which combined the crowns of Spain and Portugal, was formed. Subsequently, king Philip closed Portuguese ports to the Dutch and established a ban on trade between the Portuguese-Spanish colonies and the Dutch Republic. The Dutch attempted to restore the trade with the Portuguese colonies by occupying the northeast of Brazil, São Tomé Island, Goree and Elmina, which led to conflicts between the Dutch Empire and the Iberian Union.

On 1 December 1640, a revolution initiated in Lisbon by the Portuguese nobility and high bourgeoisie ended the Iberian Union, leading to the ascension of John IV of Portugal to the Portuguese throne. In the same year, the Portuguese Restoration War began. John IV sent ambassadors to France, England, and the Dutch Republic, in the hope of forging partnerships with these countries in his fight against Spain.

== Signing and ratification ==
The treaty was signed on 12 June 1641 in The Hague by representatives of the States-General of the Netherlands and by the ambassador of King John IV of Portugal. On 18 November 1641, the treaty was ratified by the king of Portugal and on 20 February 1642 by the States-General.

== Bibliography ==
- Cabral de Mello, E., De Braziliaanse affaire - Portugal, de Republiek der Verenigde Nederlanden en Noord-Oost Brazilië, 1641-1669 [translated from Portuguese by Catherine Barel], Zutphen: Walburg Pers, 2005. ISBN 978-90-5730-345-6
- Wiesebron, M.L., Brazilië in de Nederlandse archieven (1624 - 1654). Documenten in het Koninklijk Huisarchief en in het Archief van de Staten-Generaal. Leiden: Leiden University, 2008. ISBN 978-90-5789-157-1
