= Jean Barbier d'Aucour =

French lawyer and Jansenist (1641 – 1694)

Jean Barbier d'Aucour (1 September 1641, Langres, Champagne – 3 September 1694, Paris) was a French lawyer to the parliament of Paris, ardent Jansenist and satirist. He wrote anti-Jesuit pamphlets in prose and verse (he had formerly studied under the Jesuits).

== Publications ==
- Publications by Jean Barbier d'Aucour on WikiSource
- Onguant pour la brulure, ou le Secret pour empescher les jesuites de bruler les livres, 1664
- Observations sur une comédie de Molière, intitulée : Le festin de pierre, 1665
- Sentimens de Cléante sur les entretiens d'Ariste et d'Eugène, 1671
- Reflexions du Sr. de Bonne-foy, sur un livre, intitulé : Entretien d'un abbé commendataire, & d'un religieux, sur les commendes, 1674
- Manifeste, ou La préconisation en vers burlesques d'un nouveau livre, intitulé : Réflexions sur les veritez évangéliques, contre la traduction et les traducteurs de Mons, 1680
- 'Remarques sur deux discours prononcés à l'Académie françoise sur le rétablissement de la santé du Roy, le 27 janvier 1687, 1688
