= Un Ponte Per =

Italian-based humanitarian organization

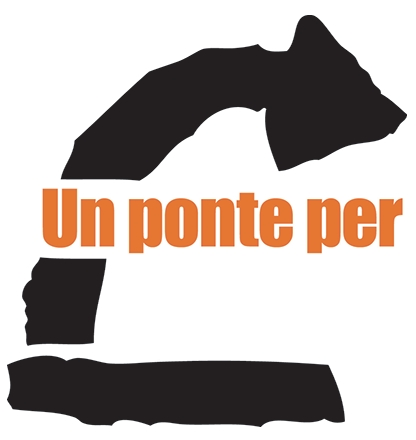
- Formation: 1991
- Purpose: Humanitarian aid
- Website: https://unponteper.it

Un Ponte Per (A Bridge to) is an Italian-based humanitarian organization created in the aftermath of the first Iraq War in 1991. Its purpose is to oppose the domination of the Southern countries of the world by those of the North and to prevent further conflict, particularly in the Mideast. In addition to its activities in the Middle East, it opened a second zone of operations in the former Yugoslavia.

Un Ponte Per operates in Iraq (as Un Ponte Per Baghdad). In September 2004 a number of the group's workers, including Italians Simona Pari and Simona Torretta, were kidnapped. They were released three weeks later.
