= European Peacebuilding Liaison Office =

- Company type: Civil society organisation
- Founded: 2001
- Headquarters: Brussels, Belgium
- Key people: Sonya Reines-Djivanides, Executive Director
- Revenue: 842,180 euro (2020)
- Website: www.eplo.org

European Peacebuilding Liaison Office (EPLO) is the independent civil society platform of European NGOs, NGO networks and think tanks which are committed to peacebuilding, and the prevention of violent conflict.

== Mission statement ==
The organisation's mission is: 'to influence European policymakers to take more active and effective approach in securing peace and nonviolent forms of conflict resolution in all regions of the world'.

== Key people ==
Sonya Reines-Djivanides has been the executive director since June 2015.

== Policy objectives ==
Its policy objectives are:

1. To ensure that conflict prevention and peacebuilding are prominent within the policies and structures of EU external affairs.
2. To secure increased resources for conflict prevention and peacebuilding.
3. To integrate peacebuilding into EU development policy, programmes and approaches.
4. To strengthen the implementation of a gender-sensitive approach in EU policy and practice which enables the EU to be more inclusive and effective in promoting peace.
5. To promote peacebuilding in EU response to specific conflicts.

== Activities ==
EPLO aims to realise its mission by channelling civil society analysis into EU policy-making. Its activities include:

- Analysis of EU policies
- Joint advocacy work
- Facilitating dialogue between civil society peacebuilding organisations and EU policymakers (EU officials, Member States' representatives and MEPs)

=== Policy areas ===
EPLO's policy work is organised in the following working groups and ad hoc groups:

- Peacebuilding and EU Institutions and Policies (website)
- Funding for Peacebuilding (website)
- Peacebuilding and Development (website)
- Gender, Peace and Security (website)
- European Investment Bank, Trade and Conflict (website)
- EU Support for Peace Processes (website)
- Middle East and North Africa (website)
- EU-Africa Relations (website)
- EU Accession and Peacebuilding (website)

=== Civil Society Dialogue Network (CSDN) ===
The Civil Society Dialogue Network (CSDN) is a mechanism for dialogue between civil society and EU policy-makers on issues related to peace and conflict. The project is co-financed by the European Union and EPLO, and managed by EPLO in co-operation with the European Commission and the European External Action Service.

Launched in 2010, the CSDN aims at strengthening EU and civil society capacity to anticipate, analyse, prevent and respond to threats to stability and human development posed by violent conflict and crisis. A third phase of the project began in April 2017 and will last until 2020.

CSDN events take the form of dialogue meetings which bring together relevant civil society actors and EU policy-makers. They take place in Brussels, EU Member States and conflict-affected countries with EU presence.

=== Academic Friends of EPLO ===
Academic Friends of EPLO is an informal network of academics working on peacebuilding and conflict issues, and/or the role of the EU in peacebuilding worldwide. The purpose of the network is to connect practitioners and advocates seeking to influence the EU to make it more effective at peacebuilding with academics carrying out research on the EU and conflict.

=== EPLO Brown Bag Lunch Events ===
EPLO Brown Bag Lunch events are 1–1.5 hour-long, informal round-table discussions on a wide range of geographic and thematic topics with relevance for the EU and its support for peacebuilding and conflict prevention. Participation is free and (usually) open to all but registration is mandatory

=== Past activities ===
==== Preventing and Responding to Conflict: Developing EU Civilian Capabilities for Sustainable Peace (EU-CIVCAP) ====
The EU-CIVCAP project was aimed at providing a comprehensive, comparative and multidisciplinary analysis of EU civilian capabilities for external conflict prevention and peacebuilding in order to identify civilian means to enhance these capabilities and address existing shortcomings. This project was launched in December 2015 and received funding from the European Union's Horizon 2020 research and innovation programme.

==== Strengthening Early Warning and Mobilising Early Action ====
The project Strengthening Early Warning and Mobilising Early Action aimed to contribute to the establishment, development and reinforcement of early warning mechanisms and increase opportunities for civil society to influence responses to conflicts by providing field-based conflict analysis to the EU and other actors active on peacebuilding in fragile countries. This three-year long project took place from June 2013 to June 2016.

==== The EU and Peacebuilding: From European Peace Project to Global Actor ====
The project consisted of a series of public events in EU Member States in the form of dialogues and round-tables which discussed opportunities and challenges for the EU to increase its peacebuilding potential and analyse the role of EU Member States in certain EU policy fields and conflict-affected regions. This project started in January 2013 and was terminated in June 2014.

==== Initiative for Peacebuilding ====
The Initiative for Peacebuilding was a consortium of 10 civil society organisations led by International Alert and funded by the European Commission. It aimed at developing and harnessing knowledge and expertise in the field of conflict prevention and peacebuilding to ensure all stakeholders can access independent analysis in order to facilitate informed and evidence-based policy decisions.

==== Conflict Prevention Partnership ====
The Conflict Prevention Partnership (CPP) was a co-operative effort composed by EPLO, the International Crisis Group, International Alert and the European Policy Centre, funded by the [European Union]. It provided EU and national policy-makers with information, analysis and policy recommendations on conflict-related issues through the publication of a series of studies. The CPP took place from September 2005 to September 2006.

==== Role of Civil Society in European Crisis Management ====
EPLO took part in the Role of Civil Society in European Crisis Management (RoCS) project in autumn 2005. The RoCS project was prepared by the Civil Society Conflict Prevention Network (KATU) and the Crisis Management Initiative as their input to the Finnish EU Presidency in 2006. Its overall objective was to promote understanding and awareness EU Member States and ESDP decision-makers on the role of civil society on promoting a human security-based approach. EPLO was also part of the second phase of the RoCS project, implemented together with the Crisis Management Initiative and the Bertelsmann Foundation and financially supported by the German Presidency of the EU.

== Member organisations ==
EPLO has 39 member organisations from 16 European countries (13 EU Member States plus Kosovo, Norway and Switzerland). EPLO's members are individual NGOs, networks of NGOs, and think tanks.

- Berghof Foundation
- Budapest Centre for Mass Atrocities Prevention
- Catholic Organization for Relief and Development (Cordaid)
- Christian Aid Ireland
- Centre for Humanitarian Dialogue (HD Centre)
- Community of Sant'Egidio
- Conciliation Resources
- Concordis International
- Crisis Management Initiative
- Democratic Progress Institute
- ESSEC IRENÉ
- European Institute of Peace
- [German Platform for Peaceful Conflict Management]
- Global Partnership for the Prevention of Armed Conflict
- Guerrand-Hermès Foundation for Peace
- Institute for Integrated Transitions
- International Alert
- [International Catalan Institute for Peace]
- International Center for Transitional Justice
- International Crisis Group
- Interpeace
- Kosovar Center for Security Studies (QKSS)
- Kvinna Till Kvinna
- Life & Peace Institute
- Nansen Centre for Peace and Dialogue
- Nonviolent Peaceforce
- Oxfam International
- Partners Bulgaria
- Pax Christi International
- Peace Action, Training and Research Institute of Romania (PATRIR)
- Peace Direct
- Quaker Council for European Affairs
- RCN Justice & Démocratie
- Search for Common Ground
- swisspeace
- Un Ponte Per
- Wider Security Network (WISE)
- World Vision International
