= Quaker United Nations Office =

Non-governmental organisation

Logo of the Quaker United Nations Office.

The Quaker United Nations Office (QUNO) is a non-governmental organisation representing the Religious Society of Friends (Quakers) at the United Nations in Geneva and New York City. Parent bodies of QUNO are the Friends World Committee for Consultation (FWCC), American Friends Service Committee and Quaker Peace and Social Witness. FWCC holds consultative status with the United Nations Economic and Social Council, and the Quaker UN Offices in New York and Geneva operate on behalf of Friends worldwide through this status. The offices work closely on issues of Human Rights and refugees, peace and disarmament, human impacts of climate change, as well as peacebuilding and the prevention of violent conflict.

In June 2013, Andrew Tomlinson and Jonathan Woolley, Directors of the New York and Geneva offices, were listed jointly by Action On Armed Violence, as one of the 100 most influential global actors in armed violence reduction.

Sarah Clarke is the current director of the New York office and Nozizwe Madlala-Routledge is the current director of the Geneva office. Past directors of the offices have included: David Atwood, Sydney Bailey, Stephen Collett, and Philip and Lois Jessup.
