= Jan Claus =

Jan Claus (Strasbourg, 19 June 1641 – Amsterdam, 8 March 1729) was a leading Quaker in Amsterdam. He was trained as a gold- and silversmith specializing in enamel and worked for a while in Cologne. In 1663 he travelled to Amsterdam where business prospects were not good. He was however given a letter of recommendation for a Londen goldsmith J.C. Follet, also from Strasbourg, who was a member of the Society of Friends. It was with Follet that Claus joined the Quakers.

The Conventicle Act 1664 which limited meetings in England led to the arrest of Jan Claus. He was convicted to be shipped to Jamaica. His ship with 54 Quakers had a slow time leaving and was hit by the plague killing all but 27. Then it was attacked by a Dutch privateer from the city of Hoorn. By 1666 Claus with 11 other Quakers found himself imprisoned in Hoorn. They were saved by Friends who had them released and brought to Amsterdam. It is not clear what happened to the others but Jan Claus, because of his command of both English and German, was pressed into staying with the Friends in Amsterdam.

It is known that Claus studied works by Johannes Tauler, Sebastian Franck and Jakob Böhme. In 1669 with Steven Crisp (1628–1692), a Friend from Colchester, who from 1663 onwards would every year visit Amsterdam, he travelled on a preaching tour to a series of towns along the Rhine: Cologne, Bonn, Metz, Bingen, Bacharach and Kriegsheim. By 1673 he was established as a buttonmaker in the company of another Quaker friend: Pieter Deen. He was for business reasons corresponding with another Friend, John Furly in Colchester. He would also travel to Friesland to preach among the Mennonites.

In 1677 Jan Claus married his second wife, a sister of a Dr. Haesbaert, a Mennonite turned Quaker preacher, from Embden who had been visited there in 1671 by William Penn and another Furly: Benjamin, who was a successful merchant and Quaker in Rotterdam. By 1674, Quakers in Embden were being persecuted and imprisoned and only after having spent much time in and out of prison, Haesbaert left for Amsterdam, leaving behind his mother.

In 1677 Jan Claus accompanied William Penn on a trip through Leeuwarden, Wieuwerd, and Groningen to Embden. In 1684, with George Fox, he visited Harlingen.

After his death on 8 March 1729, a collection of poems by family members and friends appeared in memory of Jan Claus.
