= Per Sundberg (activist) =

Swedish activist

Per Sundberg (11 October 1889 – 16 November 1947) was a Swedish educator and peace activist.

== Life ==
Sundberg was an important educator in Sweden from the 1920s on. In 1927, together with architect Carl Malmsten he founded Olofskolan in Stockholm. In 1928 he founded the boarding school Viggbyholmsskolan in Täby, which was dedicated to progressive education. It was the first mixed boarding school in Sweden.

He was a Quaker and was a peace activist. Already in 1933 Sundberg supported refugees from Nazi Germany by accommodating them in the boarding school. In 1936, he started a Quaker committee for supporting German refugees in which he was engaged in until his death. In 1943 he was involved in starting the Swedish branch of Service Civil International, Internationella Arbetslag.

The writer Gunnar Sundberg (1922–2005) is his son.
