= Handfasting =

Medieval European betrothal practice

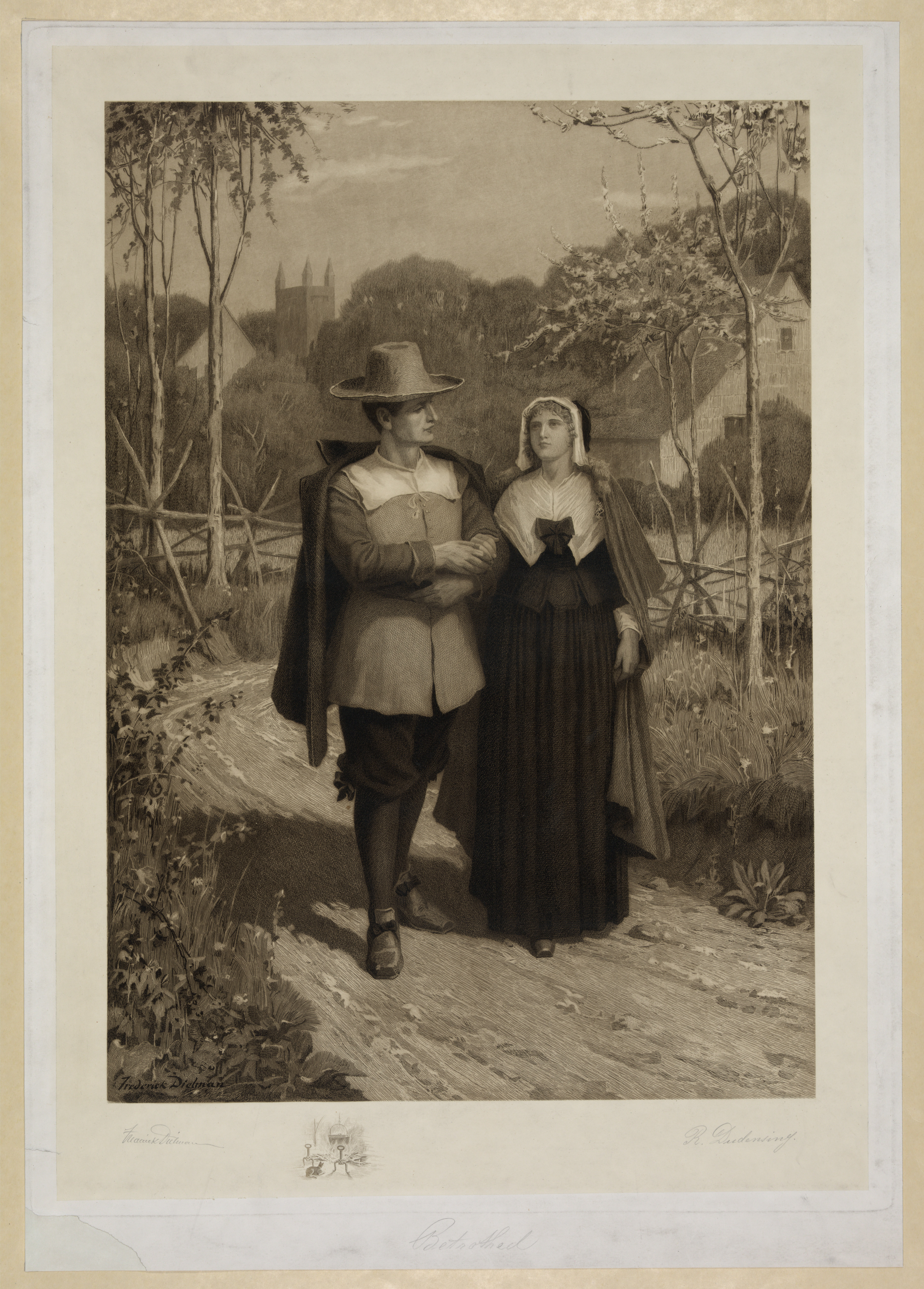
Betrothed by Richard Dudensing (1833–1899)

Handfasting (Scottish Gaelic: pòsadh-bliadhna, lit. 'year-marriage' [ˈpʰɔːs̪əɣ ˈb̥liən̪ˠə]) is a traditional practice that, depending on the term's usage, may define an unofficiated wedding (in which a couple marries without an officiant, usually with the intent of later undergoing a second wedding with an officiant), a betrothal (an engagement in which a couple has formally promised to wed, and which can be broken only through divorce), or a temporary wedding (in which a couple makes an intentionally temporary marriage commitment). The term refers to making a pledge fast by shaking or joining hands.

The terminology and practice are especially associated with Germanic peoples, including the English and Norse, as well as the Scots. As a form of betrothal or unofficiated wedding, handfasting was common up through Medieval and Tudor England; as a form of temporary marriage, it was practiced in 17th-century Scotland and has been revived in modern Paganism, though often misattributed to Celts instead of Danes and Anglo-Saxons.

Sometimes the term is also used synonymously with "wedding" or "marriage" among Neo-Pagans to avoid perceived non-Pagan religious connotations associated with those terms. It is also used, apparently ahistorically, to refer to an alleged pre-Christian practice of symbolically fastening or wrapping the hands of a couple together during the wedding ceremony.

== Etymology ==
The verb to handfast in the sense of "to formally promise, to make a contract" is recorded for Late Old English, especially in the context of a contract of marriage. The derived handfasting as for a ceremony of engagement or betrothal, is recorded in Early Modern English. The term was presumably loaned into English from Old Norse handfesta "to strike a bargain by joining hands"; there are also comparanda from the Ingvaeonic languages: Old Frisian hondfestinge and Middle Low German hantvestinge. The term is derived from the verb to handfast, used in Middle to Early Modern English for the making of a contract. In modern Dutch, "handvest" is the term for "pact" or "charter" (e.g., "Atlantisch handvest", "Handvest der Verenigde Naties"); cf. also the Italian loan word manifesto in English.

== Medieval and Tudor England ==
The Fourth Lateran Council (1215) forbade clandestine marriage, and required marriages to be publicly announced in churches by priests. In the sixteenth century, the Council of Trent legislated more specific requirements, such as the presence of a priest and two witnesses, as well as promulgation of the marriage announcement thirty days prior to the ceremony. These laws did not extend to the regions affected by the Protestant Reformation. In England, clergy performed many clandestine marriages, such as so-called Fleet Marriage, which were held legally valid; (Note: In 1601 the poet John Donne married clandestinely in a private room where only he, his bride, his friend Christopher Brooke and Brooke's brother Samuel, a clergyman, were present. No banns were called and the bride's parents did not give consent; nevertheless, the bride's father did not later legally dispute the validity of the marriage.) and in Scotland, unsolemnised common-law marriage was still valid.

From about the 12th to the 17th century, "handfasting" in England was simply a term for "engagement to be married", or a ceremony held on the occasion of such a contract, usually about a month prior to a church wedding, at which the marrying couple formally declared that each accepted the other as spouse. Handfasting was legally binding: as soon as the couple made their vows to each other they were validly married. It was not a temporary arrangement. Just as with church weddings of the period, the union which handfasting created could only be dissolved by death. English legal authorities held that even if not followed by intercourse, handfasting was as binding as any vow taken in church before a priest.

During handfasting, the man and woman, in turn, would take the other by the right hand and declare aloud that they there and then accepted each other as husband and wife. The words might vary but traditionally consisted of a simple formula such as "I (Name) take thee (Name) to my wedded husband/wife, till death us depart, and thereto I plight thee my troth". Because of this, handfasting was also known in England as "troth-plight". Gifts were often exchanged, especially rings: (Note: The rings might be plain – one was made on the spot out of a rush lying on the floor – or elaborate. They often had a posy engraved. One surviving example is a "gimmal" ring, a double ring which twists apart to become two rings interlinked. It is in the shape of two clasped hands and has the posy "As handes doe shut/so hart be knit.") (Note: Some rings incorporated "memento mori" devices, to remind the wearer the marriage was till death.) a gold coin broken in half between the couple was also common. Other tokens recorded include gloves, a crimson ribbon tied in a knot, and even a silver toothpick. Handfasting might take place anywhere, indoors or out. It was frequently in the home of the bride, but according to records handfastings also took place in taverns, in an orchard and even on horseback. The presence of a credible witness or witnesses was usual.

For much of the relevant period, church courts dealt with marital matters. Ecclesiastical law recognised two forms of handfasting, sponsalia per verba de praesenti and sponsalia per verba de futuro. In sponsalia de praesenti, the most usual form, the couple declared they there and then accepted each other as man and wife. The sponsalia de futuro form was less binding, as the couple took hands only to declare their intention to marry each other at some future date. The latter was closer to a modern engagement and could, in theory, be ended with the consent of both parties – but only providing intercourse had not occurred. If intercourse did take place, then the sponsalia de futuro "was automatically converted into de iure marriage".

Despite the validity of handfasting, it was expected to be solemnised by a church wedding fairly soon afterwards. Penalties might follow for those who did not comply. Ideally the couple were also supposed to refrain from intercourse until then. Complaints by preachers suggest that they often did not wait, but at least until the early 1600s the common attitude to this kind of anticipatory behaviour seems to have been lenient. (Note: In Shakespeare's 1604 comedy Measure for Measure a young man sleeps with his betrothed wife before his church wedding. Judged technically guilty of fornication, under puritanical laws he is condemned to die. The plot is driven by the need to rescue him, and audience sympathy is clearly expected to be on his side.)

Handfasting remained an acceptable way of marrying in England throughout the Middle Ages but declined in the early modern period. In some circumstances handfasting was open to abuse, with persons who had undergone "troth-plight" occasionally refusing to proceed to a church wedding, creating ambiguity about their former betrothed's marital status. Shakespeare negotiated and witnessed a handfasting in 1604, and was called as a witness in the suit Bellott v Mountjoy about the dowry in 1612. Historians speculate that his own marriage to Anne Hathaway was so conducted when he was a young man in 1582, as the practice still had credence in Warwickshire at the time.

After the beginning of the 17th century, gradual changes in English law meant the presence of an officiating priest or magistrate became necessary for a marriage to be legal. Finally the 1753 Marriage Act, aimed at suppressing clandestine marriages by introducing more stringent conditions for validity, effectively ended the handfasting custom in England.

== Early modern Scotland ==
In February 1539 Marie Pieris, a French lady-in-waiting to Mary of Guise, the consort of James V of Scotland, was married by handfasting to Lord Seton at Falkland Palace. This ceremony was recorded in the royal accounts for the payment to an apothecary for his work on the day of "Lord Seytounis handfasting".

The Scottish Hebrides, particularly in the Isle of Skye, show some records of 'Handfast" or "left-handed" marriage occurring in the late 1600s, when the Gaelic scholar Martin Martin noted, "It was an ancient custom in the Isles that a man take a maid as his wife and keep her for the space of a year without marrying her; and if she pleased him all the while, he married her at the end of the year and legitimatised her children; but if he did not love her, he returned her to her parents."

The most disastrous war fought between the MacLeods and MacDonalds of Skye culminated in the Battle of Coire Na Creiche when Donald Gorm Mor, who handfasted [for a year and a day] with Margaret MacLeod, a sister of Rory Mor of Dunvegan, ignominiously expelled his mistress from Duntulm. It is probable that it was as a result of this war that Lord Ochiltree's Committee, which formed the Statutes of Iona in 1609 and the Regulations for the Chiefs in 1616, was induced to insert a clause in the Statutes of Iona by which "marriages contracted for several [archaic definition 'single'] years" were prohibited; and any who might disregard this regulation were to be "punished as fornicators".

By the 18th century, the Kirk of Scotland no longer recognised marriages formed by mutual consent and subsequent sexual intercourse, even though the Scottish civil authorities did. To minimise any resulting legal actions, the ceremony was to be performed in public. This situation persisted until 1939, when Scottish marriage laws were reformed by the Marriage (Scotland) Act 1939 and handfasting was no longer recognised.

The existence of handfasting as a distinct form of "trial marriage" was doubted by A. E. Anton, in Handfasting in Scotland (1958). In the article, he asserted that the first reference to such a practice is by Thomas Pennant in his 1790 Tour in Scotland, that this report had been taken at face value throughout the 19th century, and was perpetuated in Walter Scott's 1820 novel The Monastery. However, the Pennant claim in 1790 was not the first time this had been discussed or put to print, as the Martin Martin texts predate Pennant by almost 100 years.

== Neopaganism ==
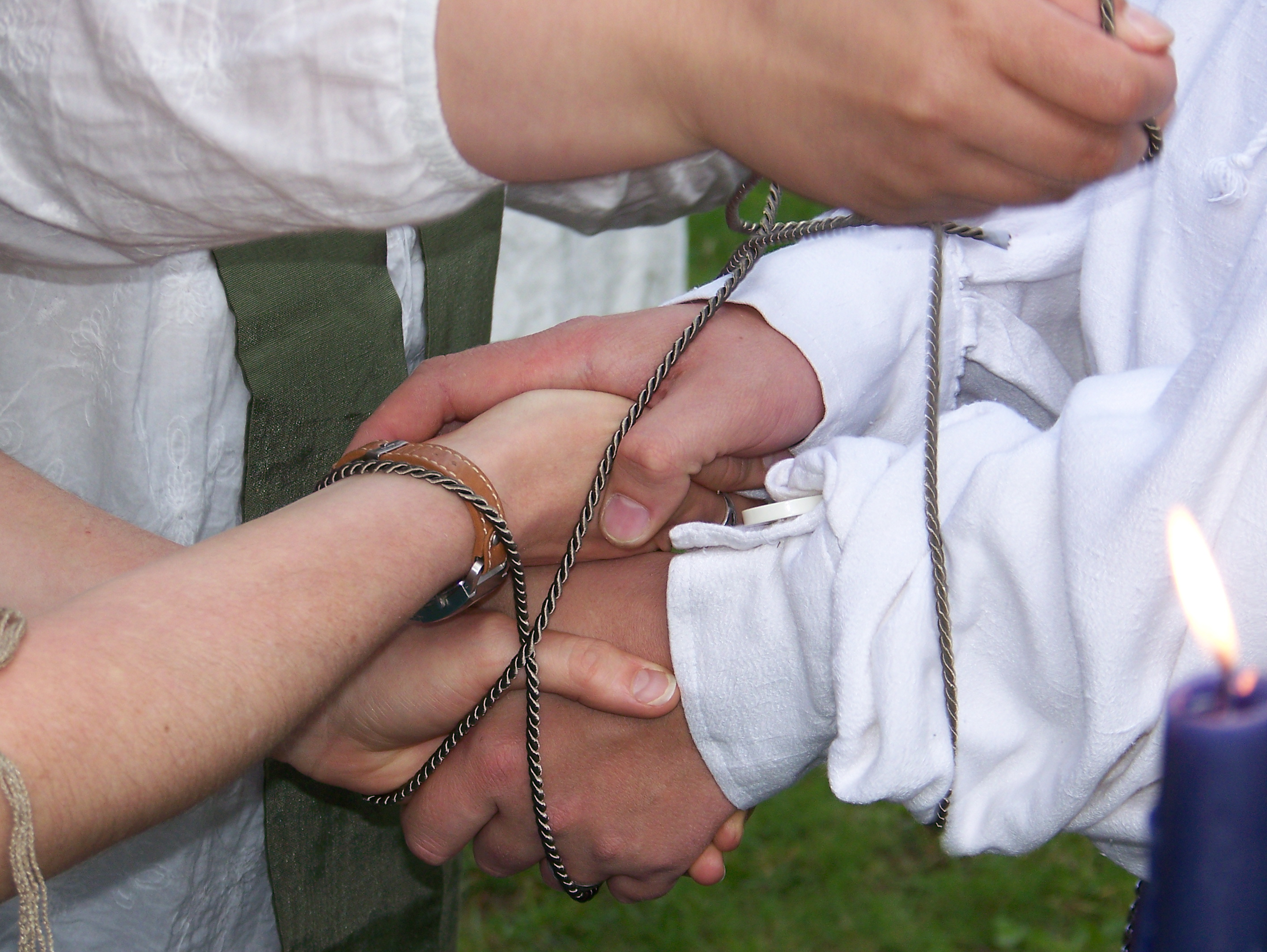
Neopagan handfasting ceremony

The term "handfasting" or "hand-fasting" was appropriated into modern Celtic neopaganism and Wicca for wedding ceremonies from at least the late 1960s, apparently first used in print by Hans Holzer.

Handfasting was mentioned in the 1980 Jim Morrison biography No One Here Gets Out Alive and again in the 1991 film The Doors, where a version of the real 1970 handfasting ceremony of Morrison and Patricia Kennealy was depicted (with the actual Kennealy-Morrison portraying the Celtic neopagan priestess).

=== Handfasting ribbon ===
The term has entered the English-speaking mainstream, most likely from neopagan wedding ceremonies during the early 2000s, often erroneously being described as "pre-Christian" by wedding planners. Evidence that the term "handfasting" had been re-interpreted as describing this ceremony specifically is found in the later 2000s, e.g. "handfasting—the blessed marriage rite in which the hands of you and your beloved are wrapped in ribbon as you 'tie the knot'."

By the 2010s, "handfasting ceremonies" were on offer by commercial wedding organizers and had mostly lost their neopagan association (apart from occasional claims that attributes the ceremony to the "ancient Celts"). The term "handfasting ribbon" appears from about 2005.

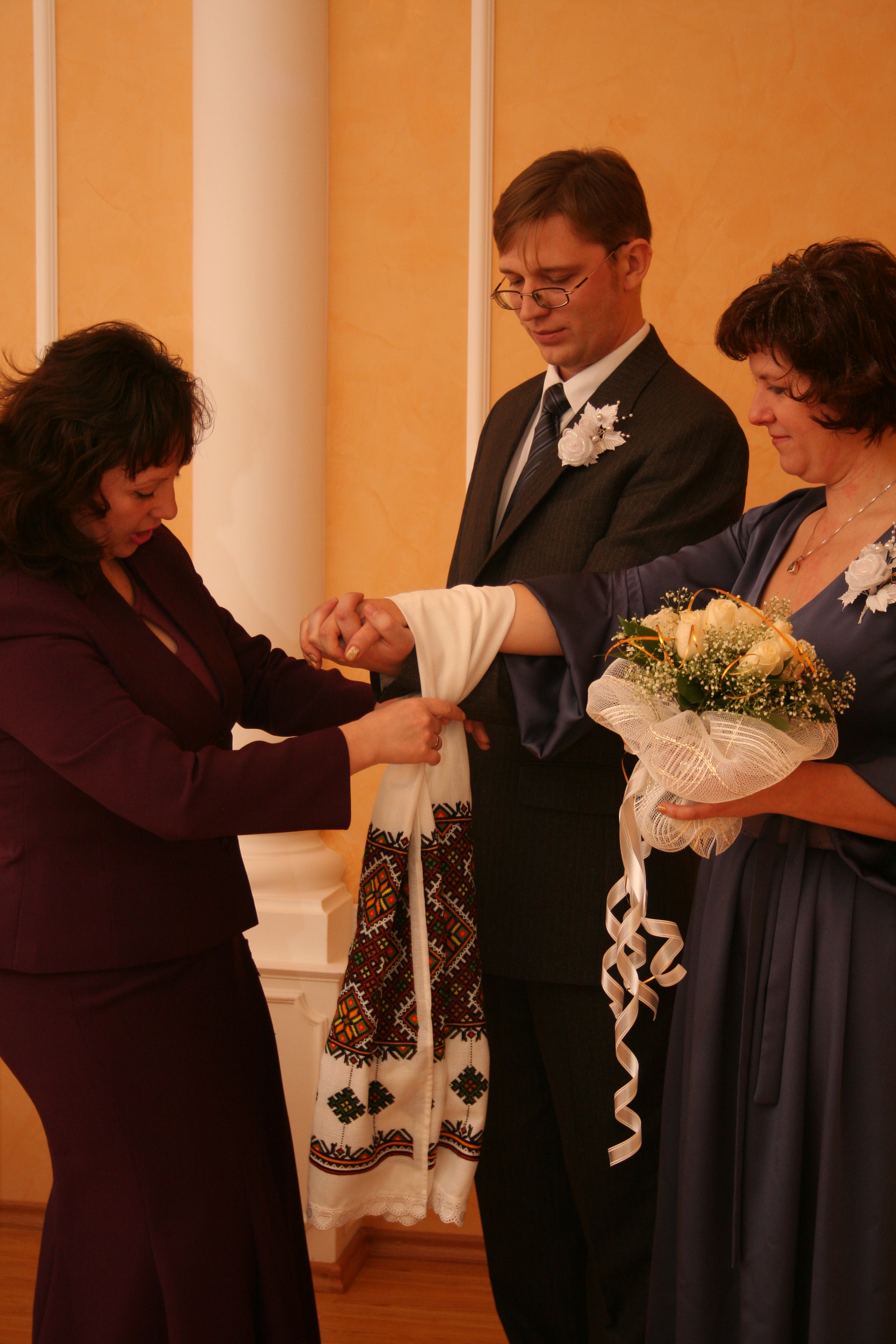
Civil wedding ceremony in Ukraine. The cloth is a ceremonial rushnyk decorated with traditional Ukrainian embroidery.

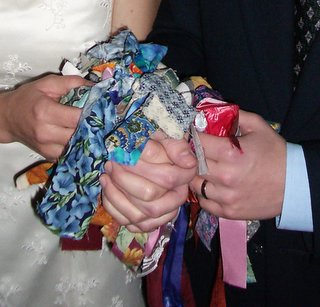
An example of a modern handfasting knot where each wedding guest has tied a ribbon around the clasped hands of the couple.

== See also ==
- Betrothal
- Broomstick marriage
- Civil marriage
- Common-law marriage
- Elopement
- Self-uniting marriage
- Temporary marriage
- Marriage law
- Black wedding
- White wedding
