= William Hemsley =

William Hemsley may refer to:

- William Hemsley (politician) (1737–1812), American planter, Continental congressman from Maryland
- William Hemsley (botanist) (1843–1924), British botanist
- William Hemsley (painter) (1819–1906), British genre painter

== See also ==
- William Helmsley, Member of Parliament
