= Fleet marriage =

Historical type of irregular or clandestine marriage in England

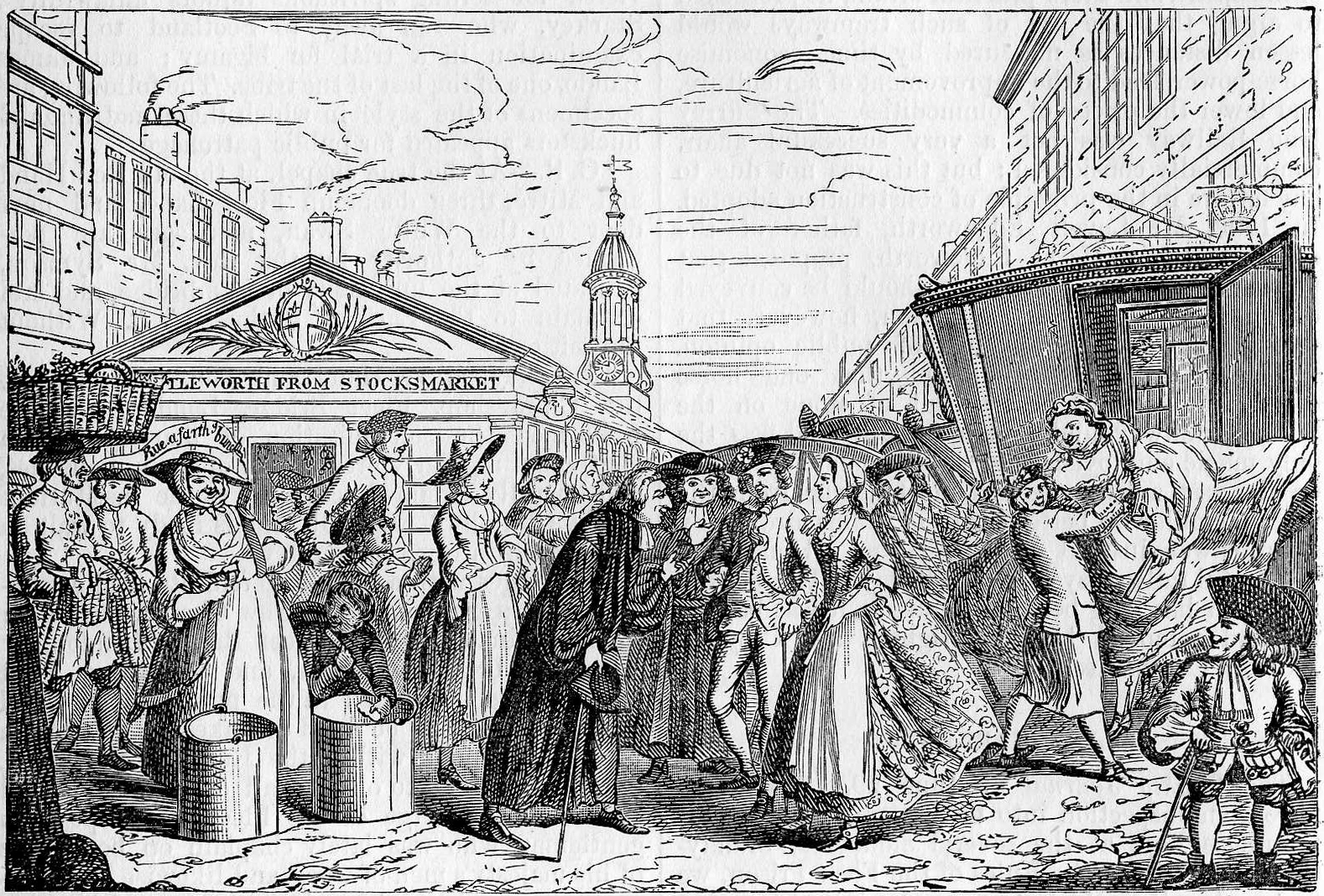
Caricature of a Fleet marriage

A Fleet marriage was a common example of an irregular or a clandestine marriage taking place in England before the Marriage Act 1753 came into force on March 25, 1754. Specifically, it was one which took place in London's Fleet Prison or its environs during the 17th and, especially, the early 18th century.

== Irregular and clandestine marriages ==
An "irregular marriage" was one that took place either away from the home parish of the spouses (but after banns or licence), or at an improper time. "Clandestine" marriages were those that had an element of secrecy to them: perhaps they took place away from a home parish, and without either banns or marriage licence.

It is often asserted that under English law of this period a marriage could be recognized in court if each spouse could provide evidence they had simply expressed (to each other) an unconditional consent to their marriage. With few local exceptions, earlier Christian marriages across Europe were by mutual consent, declaration of intention to marry and upon the subsequent physical union of the parties. By the 18th century, the earlier form of weddings ("common-law marriages" in modern terms) were the exception. Nearly all wedding ceremonies in England, including the "irregular" and "clandestine" ones, were performed by ordained clergy.

The Marriage Duty Act 1695 put an end to irregular marriages at parochial churches by penalizing clergy who married couples without banns or licence. By a legal quirk, however, clergy operating in the Fleet could not effectively be proceeded against, and the clandestine marriage business there carried on. In the 1740s, over half of all London weddings were taking place in the environs of the Fleet Prison. The majority of Fleet marriages were for honest purposes, when couples simply wanted to get married quickly or at low cost.

From 1742 to 1754 a large number of such marriages were also conducted at Keith's Chapel, Westminster, by the Reverend Alexander Keith.

== Fleet Prison ==
The earliest recorded date of a Fleet marriage is 1613 (although there were probably earlier ones), while the earliest recorded in a Fleet register took place in 1674. As a prison, the Fleet was claimed to be outside the jurisdiction of the church. The prison warders took a share of the profit, even though a statute of 1711 imposed fines upon them for doing so: it only moved the clandestine marriage trade outside the prison. There were, in fact, so many debtors that many lived in the area outside the prison (itself a lawless area which operated under the "rules of the Fleet"). Disgraced clergy (and many who pretended to be clergy) lived there, and marriage houses or taverns carried on the trade, encouraged by local tavern-keepers in the neighbourhood who employed touts to solicit custom for them. There were also many clerks who made money recording the ceremonies.

During the 1740s, up to 6,000 marriages a year were taking place in the Fleet area, compared with 47,000 in England as a whole. One estimate suggests that there were between 70 and 100 clergy working in the Fleet area between 1700 and 1753. It was not merely a marriage centre for criminals and the poor, however: both rich and poor availed themselves of the opportunity to marry quickly or in secret.

== Marriage Act 1753 ==
The scandal and abuses brought about by these clandestine marriages became so great that they became the object of special legislation. In 1753, Lord Hardwicke's Marriage Act was passed, which required, under pain of annulment, that banns should be published or a licence obtained; that, in either case, the marriage should be solemnized in church by a recognised cleric; and that in the case of minors, marriage by licence must be by the consent of parent or guardian; and that at least two witnesses must be present. Jewish and Quaker ceremonies were exempt. Clergy conducting clandestine marriages were liable to transportation.

This act put a stop to these marriages, so far as England and Wales were concerned, and henceforth couples had to travel to Scotland, the nearest point being Gretna Green. This had substantial use until 1856, when Scottish law was changed to require 21 days' residence. The act did not extend to Scotland, the Channel Islands or the Isle of Man. Similar legislation was passed in the Isle of Man in 1757.

== See also ==
- History of marriage in Great Britain and Ireland
- Jumping the broom, Broomstick marriage
- Marriage in England and Wales
- Savoy Chapel
- Schulze Registers
- The Clandestine Marriage

== Sources ==
- Weinreb, Ben; Hibbert, Christopher, eds. (1995). The London Encyclopaedia (2nd ed.). Macmillan. ISBN 0-333-57688-8.
- Chambers, Robert (1864). The Book of Days.
