= Hemsley =

Hemsley is a surname.

Notable people with the surname include:

- Alfred Hemsley (1860–1937), politician
- Ben Hemsley (born 1996 or 1997), British disc jockey and producer
- Colin Hemsley (born 1949), cricketer
- Estelle Hemsley (1887–1968), actress
- Gilbert Vaughn Hemsley Jr. (1936–1983), lighting designer
- Harry Hemsley (1877–1951), music hall and radio comedian
- James Hemsley (born 1941), British entrepreneur
- Jasmine and Melissa Hemsley (born 1980 and 1985), English food writers
- John Hemsley (born 1935), British Army officer, writer and rally driver
- Kerry Hemsley (born 1960), rugby league footballer
- Margaret Hemsley (born 1971), Australian racing cyclist
- Nate Hemsley (born 1974), American football linebacker
- Oliver Hemsley (born 1962), businessman and entrepreneur
- Rollie Hemsley (1907–1972), baseball catcher
- Sherman Hemsley (1938–2012), actor
- Stephen J. Hemsley (born 1952), manager
- Ted Hemsley (born 1943), footballer and cricketer
- Thomas Hemsley (1927–2013), English musician
- William Hemsley (politician) (1737–1812), planter and U.S. Representative from Maryland
- William Hemsley (botanist) (1843–1924), botanist
- William Hemsley (painter) (1817 or 1819 – 1906), genre painter

== See also ==
- Helmsley (disambiguation)
- Hemsley Winfield (1907–1934), dancer
- Styrax hemsleyanus, aka Hemsley snowball
