= Lutheran Church in Ireland =

The Lutheran Church in Ireland (Irish: An Eaglais Liútarach in Éirinn, German: Evangelisch-Lutherische Kirche in Irland) is a Lutheran church, operating across the island of Ireland.

In 1955 the Lutheran church was re-established in Dublin, with the installation of Pastor Hans Mittorp and moved to the former Catholic Apostolic Church (a small Protestant sect sometimes referred to as the Irvingites after its founder) St. Finian's Lutheran Church, Adelaide Road, Dublin, designed by the architect Enoch Trevor Owen. In 1939, St. Finians was handed over fully to the Church of Ireland.

== Lutheran Church Poolbeg Street ==
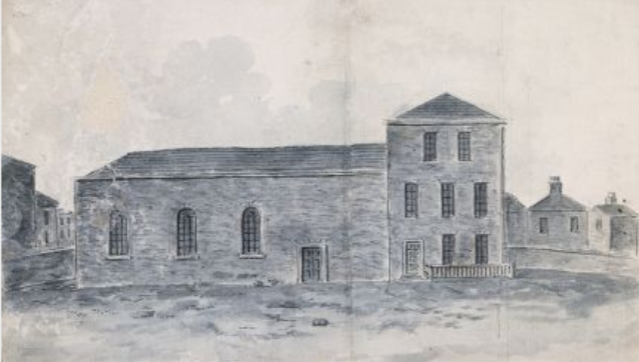
An illustration of the Lutheran church on Poolbeg Street around 1820.

There was an earlier Lutheran Church in Poolbeg Street built in 1725, which catered for the Lutherans in Dublin, a number of German and Dutch soldiers would have settled in Dublin following the Battle of the Boyne and it would have been known locally as the German Church or the Dutch Church. Schulze Registers documents the clandestine marriages (marriages to people outside the Lutheran community) which were performed in the German Protestant Lutheran Church in Poolbeg St. by Rev. John George Fredrick Schulze (1764–1839), who served as pastor from 1806 until his death. The Welsh Calvinistic Methodists used the church for worship prior to establishing their own chapel on Talbot Street in 1838. In 1840 (and shortly after Schulze death) worship ceased at the church following a fire and the church building and land including the graveyard were sold, the building remained standing until the 1940s. A small community of Lutherans persisted without a chapel, which ceased to convene in the early twentieth century.

== Re-establishment of the Lutheran Church in Ireland ==
Following an increase in the number of Lutherans in Ireland following the Second World War, the Lutheran Church was re-established in 1955. They moved into St Finian's Adelaide Road, which was leased from the Church of Ireland and the Church was rededicated in 1961, a German and a Swedish Bishop and the Archbishop of Dublin in attendance.

The Lutheran Church in Ireland maintains a special relationship with the Evangelical Church in Germany and a majority of its members originally came from the German-speaking countries and regions in Europe. In January 2015, a non-stipendiary minister was ordained in Dublin by Frank Otfried July, the Landesbischof of the Evangelical-Lutheran Church in Württemberg.

The mother parish is located in Dublin. Although the services are mostly conducted in German, on the last Sunday of each month it is held in English. Services in German also take place in Belfast, Castlepollard, Cork, Galway, Killarney, Limerick, Sligo and Wexford.

The church is a member of the Irish Council of Churches, and a member of the Dublin Council of Churches, of which the Pastor of St. Finians is a patron.

In 1984 the Dublin and Belfast congregations entered a partnership where the Dublin-based pastor would conduct a monthly service in Belfast. The Belfast service is held in the Moravian Church, University Road.

In 2009, the Lutheran Church in Ireland had a baptised membership of 300. In the Republic of Ireland's census, the number of people listing Lutheranism as their religion was 756 in 2002 and 5,329 in 2016. In Northern Ireland the corresponding figures were 186 in 2001 and 294 in 2011.

== Latvian Evangelical Lutheran Church ==
St Finians also hosts the Latvian Evangelical Lutheran Church in Ireland, with a weekly service in Latvian, there is a monthly service in Polish, and occasionally a service in Estonian. On 3 April 2022 the first Latvian priest was ordained in Dublin, in Christchurch Cathedral (Church of Ireland), the Latvian Evangelical Lutheran Church abroad being part of the Porvoo Communion with the Anglican Church of Ireland.
