= Thomas Graa =

Member of the England Parliament for York
- In office 1376–1379
- Preceded by: John de Gisburn/John de Acastre
- Succeeded by: William Savage/William Selby
- In office 1383–1383
- Preceded by: William Savage/William Selby
- Succeeded by: Thomas Quixley/John Howden
- In office 1385–1386
- Preceded by: Thomas Quixley/John Howden
- Succeeded by: Thomas Holme/John Howden
- In office 1393–1397
- Preceded by: William Selby/John Howden
- Succeeded by: William Frost/John Bolton

Personal details
- Born: Unknown Unknown
- Died: 1405 York
- Resting place: St. Mary, Castlegate, York

Thomas Graa was one of two Members of Parliament for the constituency of York. He was the third member of his family to have represented the city in Parliament after his grandfather John Graa and his father William Graa.

== Life and politics ==
Thomas Graa was the son of York merchant, William Graa. The Graa family were a rich and prominent family in the city of York in the fourteenth century. He married Agnes of Woodhall in 1369. He owned land in Sand Hutton and Skelton as well as renting tenements in York, namely in Coney Street and Coppergate. Among his achievements was to sit on several royal commissions in Yorkshire and a term as Lord Mayor of York in 1375. Thomas was married twice more. Secondly, in 1381, to Maud Multon from Ingleby in Lincolnshire and thirdly, in 1401, to Alice Colthorpe, a widow, from Kingston upon Hull. Thanks to his second wife, he acquired the manors of Ingleby and Frampton in Lincolnshire. He also had interests in estates in Helmsley and the manor of Nunwick near Ripon. Through his many land dealings, he became a respected authority on property disputes and was retained by many in respect of executing wills and as an arbitrator.

Thomas made his own fortune from the supply and export of wool. His business acumen was recognised when serving in Parliament when he was appointed to a committee to consider changes to the royal household. His reputation was somewhat damaged during unrest among the merchants of York in 1380. Though not directly punished for his role in the rioting that occurred in the city, he was implicated in the local instigation of that summer's Peasants' Revolt. His prowess in international trade led him to be despatched as a negotiator in talks with Conrad Zolner, the Grand Master of the Teutonic Order in June 1388. He was accompanied by Master Nicholas Stocket, a clerk and two merchants. Their mission was to petition for the release of English merchants and their property that had been seized in Prussia and that English merchants should have the same trading freedoms as the Prussian merchants did in England.

Following his marriage to Alice Colthorpe, he gradually withdrew from public life. He died at some date in 1405 and was buried before the altar of St. John the Evangelist and St. John the Baptist at the church of St. Mary in Castlegate, next to his second wife.

Political offices
Preceded by John de Gisburn/John de Acastre	Member of Parliament; 1376-1382	Next: William Savage/William Selby

Political offices
Preceded by William Savage/William Selby	Member of Parliament; 1383	Next: Thomas Quixley/John Howden

Political offices
Preceded by Thomas Quixley/John Howden	Member of Parliament; 1385-1386	Next: Thomas Holme/John Howden

Political offices
Preceded by William Selby/John Howden	Member of Parliament; 1393-1397	Next: William Frost/John Bolton
