= Schulze Registers =

The Schulze Registers are the only surviving record of clandestine marriages in Ireland.

Canon law in the 18th and 19th centuries in Ireland stipulated that banns should be called or a marriage licence obtained before a marriage could take place and that the marriage should be celebrated in the parish where at least one of the parties was resident. Also, the marriage had to be celebrated by a clergyman of one of the religious denominations then in Ireland.

Some clergymen were willing, for a fee, to marry couples in secret, in "irregular" or "clandestine" marriages. This might have been necessary for a number of reasons, for example, objections of parents, problems with religious affiliation, or financial difficulty. While most of these "couple-beggars" did not keep a record of the marriages, some did—among them J.G.F. Schulze (died February 1839), minister of the Lutheran Church in Poolbeg Street, Dublin. He was licensed to act only in his own congregation, but is known to have married couples of all sects, recording over 6,000 marriages between 1806 and 1837. Two of his registers of marriage survive, and are held by the General Register Office of Births, Deaths and Marriages in Dublin. The marriages performed by Schulze, over 6000, have also been indexed in a book 'Irregular Marriages in Dublin before 1837' by Henry (Harry) McDowell (2015).

== See also ==
- Fleet Marriage
