= William Helmsley =

English Member of Parliament (died 1404)

William Helmsley (died 1404), of York, was an English draper and Member of Parliament (MP).

He married twice. His first wife's name is unrecorded, but they had one son. It is assumed that she died at some point before Michaelmas 1370, by which point he was married to a woman named Alice. Together they had at least four sons and at least two daughters, and Alice died in 1401.

He was a Member of the Parliament of England for City of York in 1393. He was Mayor of York 3 February 1394–5.

Parliament of England
Preceded by William Selby; John Howden	Member of Parliament for City of York; 1393; With: Thomas Graa	Succeeded by Thomas Graa; John ?
