= Helmsley (disambiguation) =

== Places ==
- Helmsley, town in North Yorkshire, England
  - Helmsley Castle, medieval structure
- Gate Helmsley, village in North Yorkshire, England
- Upper Helmsley, village in North Yorkshire, England
- The Helmsley Building in New York City, New York, United States

== People ==
- Harry Helmsley (1909–1997), New York real estate investor
- Hunter Hearst Helmsley or Triple H (born 1969), American professional wrestler
- Leona Helmsley (1920–2007), hotel operator and wife of Harry Helmsley
- William Helmsley, Member of Parliament

== Other ==
- Helmsley, the hymn tune for Lo! He comes with clouds descending

== See also ==
- Hemsley, surname
