= Clearness committee =

Process for discernment in the Religious Society of Friends

A clearness committee is a process for discernment within the Religious Society of Friends (Quakers). It is often used when a member of the meeting seeks to reach clarity on how to respond to a concern or dilemma.

Like Quaker business meetings, meetings of clearness committees are considered a form of meeting for worship and are based on the principle that the inner light is present in all people. The process thus is one of aiding the person seeking clearness in finding the answer within, rather than offering outside advice or guidance. A clearness committee can be requested by anyone for any reason and will usually be appointed by one of the standing committees of a Monthly Meeting.

In addition to those requested by individuals, clearness committees are appointed by most meetings when a person applies for membership and when a couple seeks marriage under the care of the meeting. In these cases, the committee serves the dual purpose of helping the person or couple find clearness that this is the proper step and ensuring that the meeting is ready to take the member or couple under their care.

Clearness committees were frequently used by the Quaker-influenced Movement for a New Society and occasionally show up in other progressive organizations in the Philadelphia area, especially those with pacifist or nonviolence orientations.

== See also ==
- Dialogue
- Learning circle
- Pastoral care
- Pastoral counseling
