= Ondertrouw =

Dutch and Belgian marriage registration

Ondertrouw (a Dutch word; also huwelijksaangifte, "deposition for marriage") refers to the statutory requirement in the Netherlands and Belgium to formally register the intention to marry.

== Origin and development ==
This ancient custom is similar to the publication of banns of marriage, but it is a civil process not an ecclesiastical one. (Ondertrouw does not refer to the banns. The Dutch phrase for "banns" is kerkelijke huwelijksaankondiging.) Ondertrouw existed before the Reformation and was continued afterwards. Ondertrouw has survived into modern times and exists today as a pre-marriage legal requirement in both the Netherlands and Belgium. In both countries civil marriage is compulsory and couples intending to marry register their ondertrouw beforehand at the civil registry (Burgerlijke Stand). Ondertrouw is now analogous to the process of applying for a marriage licence. Sometimes it is referred to as notice of intention to marry (huwelijksaangifte).

Ondertrouw should not be confused with the reading of the banns, engagement or betrothal. The word ondertrouw itself has no English equivalent. A common phrase used in this context is "in ondertrouw gaan". A similar phrase used in the 18th century Netherlands was "in ondertrouw opgenomen". Both phrases mean "to enter into ondertrouw".

== Procedure ==
The length of the ondertrouw period can vary. Historically the period was three weeks. The idea was that there had to be enough time to determine that all legal and ecclesiastical requirements for marriage had been complied with.

In the Netherlands, the period between the ondertrouw and the marriage is not fixed. However, under article 46 of Book 1 of the Dutch Civil Code the maximum period is a year and under article 62 of Book 1 the minimum period is fourteen days unless an exemption is obtained from the Public Prosecutor (Openbaar Ministerie).

When the ondertrouw is registered at a town hall in the Netherlands, the following takes place:

- The production of the deed or certificates of birth
- Setting the time and date of the marriage ceremony (In the Netherlands the marriage ceremony itself is usually held at the town hall. Each town hall has a special hall for this.)
- The selection of the witnesses (In the Netherlands at least two witnesses must be present at the marriage ceremony. Their presence is integrated into the ceremony.)
- Determining the cost of the marriage ceremony to be charged by the municipality (One of the factors involved in this is the date and time.)
- Presentation of authorisation documents from the IND (the Dutch immigration department) if one of the partners does not have Dutch nationality
- Provision of information to the couple about the marriage ceremony itself
- Provision of information by the couple to the municipality any precise wishes they have about this

In Belgium (taking Antwerp as an example), after the ondertrouw the civil marriage must take place within no less than two weeks and no more than six months. The procedure is similar to that described above.

== Religious weddings ==
Ondertrouw is part of the mandatory civil marriage process, but some couples choose to have a religious wedding as well. In Belgium, couples intending to have a Roman Catholic wedding as well as a civil marriage register with the parish priest, usually at the bride's parish. The priest also gives pastoral guidance. In the Netherlands those wanting a religious wedding will arrange to have one after the civil marriage. In this event the civil ceremony is often a modest affair and may not really take much of the form of a wedding.
