= Marriage license =

Document authorizing a couple to marry

A marriage license (or marriage licence in Commonwealth spelling) is a document issued, either by a religious organization or state authority, authorizing a couple to marry. The procedure for obtaining a license varies between jurisdictions, and has changed over time. Marriage licenses began to be issued in the Middle Ages, to permit a marriage that would otherwise be illegal (for instance, if the necessary period of notice for the marriage had not been given).

Today, they are a legal requirement in some jurisdictions and may also serve as the record of the marriage itself, if signed by the couple and witnessed. In other jurisdictions, a license is not required. In some jurisdictions, a "pardon" can be obtained for marrying without a license, and in some jurisdictions, common-law marriages and marriage by cohabitation and representation are also recognized. These do not require a marriage license. There are also some jurisdictions where marriage licenses do not exist at all and a marriage certificate is given to the couple after the marriage ceremony has taken place.

== History ==
Some states in the US hold that public cohabitation can be sufficient evidence of a valid marriage. Marriage license application records from government authorities are widely available starting from the mid-19th century. Some are available dating from the 17th century in colonial America. Marriage licenses have been required since 1639 in Massachusetts, with their use gradually expanding to other jurisdictions.

== Australia ==
In Australia, there is no requirement to obtain a marriage licence. However, a person under the age of 18 requires the authorisation of a judge to marry. Couples must provide their marriage celebrant with a Notice of Intended Marriage at least one month and up to 18 months before a wedding.

== United Kingdom ==
=== England and Wales ===
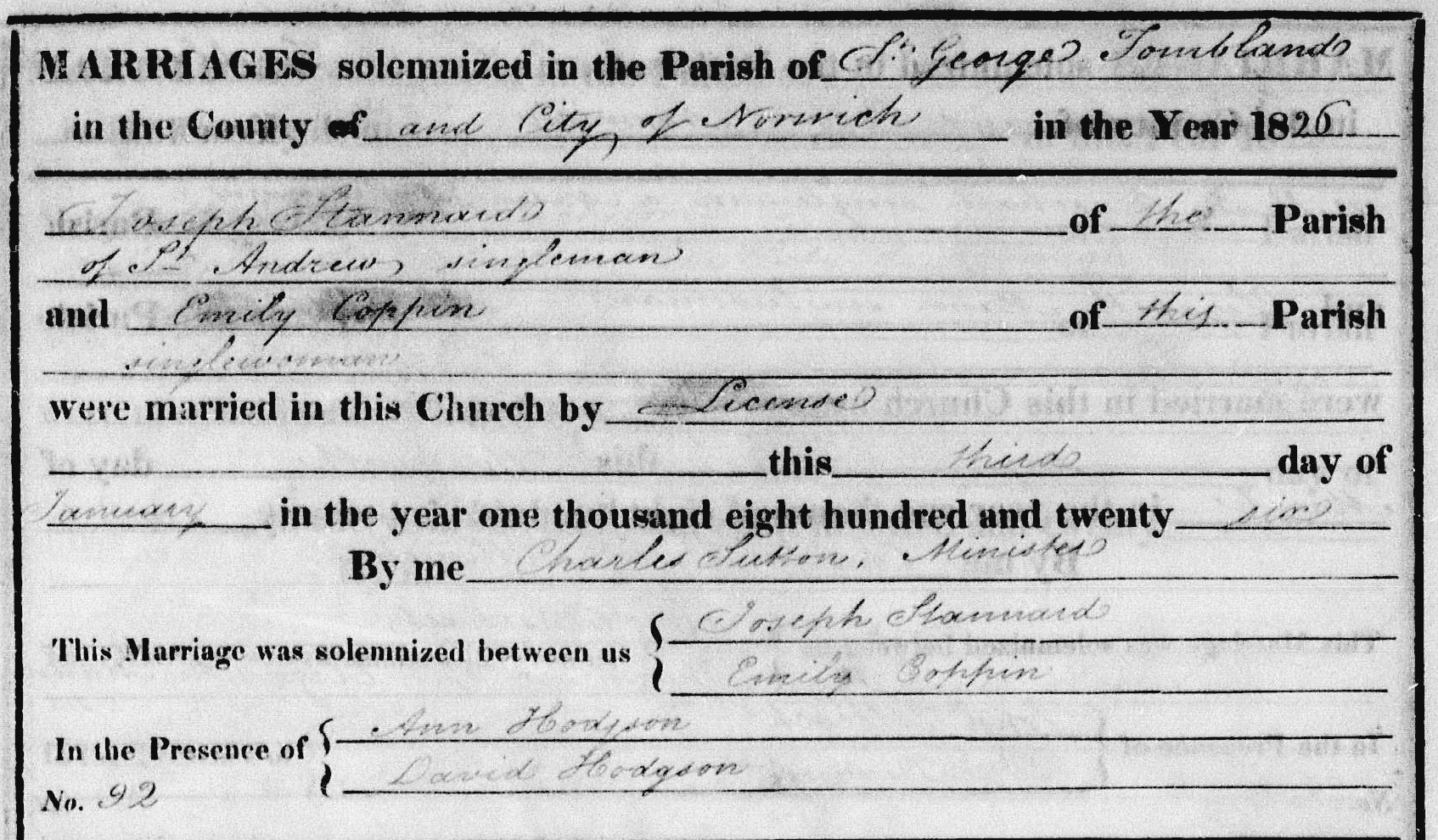
Marriage record of Joseph Stannard and Emily Coppin (1826)

A requirement for banns of marriage was introduced to England and Wales by the Church in 1215. This required a public announcement of a forthcoming marriage, in the couple's parish church, for three Sundays prior to the wedding and gave an opportunity for any objections to the marriage to be voiced (for example, that one of the parties was already married or that the couple was related within a prohibited degree), but a failure to call banns did not affect the validity of the marriage.

Marriage licences were introduced in the 14th century, to allow the usual notice period under banns to be waived, on payment of a fee (see Droit du seigneur and merchet) and accompanied by a sworn declaration, that there was no canonical impediment to the marriage. Licences were usually granted by an archbishop, bishop or archdeacon. There could be a number of reasons for a couple to obtain a licence: they might wish to marry quickly (and avoid the three weeks' delay by the calling of banns); they might wish to marry in a parish away from their home parish; or, because a licence required a higher payment than banns, they might choose to obtain one as a status symbol.

There were two kinds of marriage licences that could be issued: the usual was known as a "common licence" and named one or two parishes where the wedding could take place, within the jurisdiction of the person who issued the licence. The other was the special licence, which could only be granted by the Archbishop of Canterbury or his officials and allowed the marriage to take place in any church.

Hardwicke's Marriage Act 1753 affirmed this existing ecclesiastical law and built it into statutory law. From this date, a marriage was only legally valid, if it followed the calling of banns in church or the obtaining of a licence—the only exceptions being Jewish and Quaker marriages, whose legality was also recognised. From the date of Lord Hardwicke's Marriage Act up to 1837, the ceremony was required to be performed in a consecrated building.

Since 1 July 1837, civil marriages have been a legal alternative to church marriages under the Marriage Act 1836, which provided the statutory basis for regulating and recording marriages. So, today, a couple has a choice between being married in the Anglican Church, (Note: This may be the Church of England, or the Church in Wales, as the marriage law of the Church of England applies in almost exactly the same way to the area covered by the Church in Wales.) after the calling of banns or obtaining a common or special licence or else, they can give "Notice of Marriage" to a civil registrar. In this latter case, the notice is publicly posted for 15 days, after which a civil marriage can take place. Marriages may take place in churches other than Anglican churches, but these are governed by civil marriage law and notice must be given to the civil registrar in the same way. The marriage may then take place without a registrar being present if the church itself is registered for marriages and the minister or priest is an Authorised Person for marriages.

The licence does not record the marriage itself, only the permission for a marriage to take place. Since 1837, the proof of a marriage has been by a marriage certificate, issued at the ceremony; before then, it was by the recording of the marriage in a parish register.

The provisions on civil marriage in the 1836 Act were repealed by the Marriage Act 1949. The Marriage Act 1949 re-enacted and re-stated the law on marriage in England and Wales.

=== Scotland ===
Marriage law and practice in Scotland differs from that in England and Wales. Historically, it was always considered legal and binding for a couple to marry by making public promises, without a formal ceremony but this form has not been available since 1940. More recently "marriage by cohabitation with repute" has also been abolished for any relationship commenced since 2006. Church marriages "without proclamation" are somewhat analogous to the English "marriages by licence", although the permission to perform them is not a church matter. Religious marriages in Scotland have never had a restriction on the place in which they are performed. Marriages in Scotland normally require between 2 and 6 weeks' notice to the district registrar depending on the previous marital status and other procedural matters usually involving the country of residence and the nationality of the parties. Marriages with less than the normal amount of notice require the permission of the Registrar General.

== United States ==
In the United States, until the mid-19th century, common-law marriages were recognized as valid, but thereafter some states began to invalidate common-law marriages. Common-law marriages, if recognized by law, are valid, notwithstanding the absence of a marriage license; this becomes an issue in the settlement of decedents' estates. North Carolina and Tennessee (which was originally western North Carolina) never recognized marriage at the common law as valid without a license unless entered into in other states. They have always recognized otherwise valid marriages (except bigamous, polygamous, interracial, or same-sex) entered into in conformity with the law of other states, territories and nations.

The specifications for obtaining a marriage license vary between states. In general, however, both parties must appear in person at the time the license is obtained; be of marriageable age (i.e., over 18 years; lower in some states with the consent of a parent); present proper identification (typically a driver's license, state ID card, birth certificate or passport; more documentation may be required for those born outside of the United States); and neither must be married to anyone else (proof of spouse's death or divorce may be required for someone who had been previously married in some states).

The US states of Louisiana, Florida, Connecticut, Wisconsin, Indiana, Oklahoma, Massachusetts, Mississippi, California, New York, and the District of Columbia once required blood tests before issuing a marriage license, but such requirements have since been abolished. The tests were mainly used to check for previous or current bouts of syphilis and rubella (German measles); other diseases that have been screened for before marriage in some cases have included tuberculosis, gonorrhea, and HIV, the last of which is the only one of those three that is detectable using a blood test.

Many states require 1 to 6 days' waiting period to pass between the granting of the license and the marriage ceremony. After the marriage ceremony, both spouses and the officiant sign the marriage license (some states also require one or two witnesses). The officiant or couple then files for a certified copy of the marriage license and a marriage certificate with the appropriate authority. Some states also have a requirement that a license be filed within a certain time after its issuance, typically 30 or 60 days, following which a new license must be obtained.

Marriage licenses in the United States fall under the jurisdiction of the state in which the ceremony is performed; however, the marriage is generally recognized across the country. The state in which they are married holds the record of that marriage. Traditionally, working with law enforcement was the only means of searching and accessing marriage license information across state lines.

In Alabama, a law was passed in 2019 which abolished the issuance of marriage licenses and repealed a requirement for solemnization. Instead, couples of legal age are allowed to jointly fill out a marriage certificate, have their certificate notarized by two notaries public, and submit their certificate to an Alabama judge, who is required to accept their certificate.

=== Controversy in the US ===
Some groups and individuals believe that the requirement to obtain a marriage license is unnecessary or immoral. The Libertarian Party, for instance, believes that marriage should be a matter of personal liberty, not requiring permission from the state. Individuals who align with this libertarian stance argue that marriage is a right, and that by allowing the state to exercise control over marriage, it falsely presupposes that we merely have the privilege, not the right, to marry. As an example of a right (as opposed to a privilege), those that are born in the US receive a birth certificate (certifying that they have been born), not a birth license (which would give them license so they could be born). Some Christian groups also argue that a marriage is a contract between a man and a woman presided over by God, so no authorization from the state is required. Some US states have started citing the state specifically as a party in the marriage contract which is seen by some as an infringement.

Marriage licenses have also been the subject of controversy for affected minority groups. California's Proposition 8 has been the subject of heavy criticism by advocates of same-sex marriage, including the lesbian, gay, bisexual, and transgender (LGBT) community whose ability to marry is often limited by the aforementioned state intervention. This changed on June 26, 2015, with the Supreme Court decision in Obergefell v. Hodges. However, the state and federal intervention still continues to limit the ability of members of other minority religious groups from marrying according to the dictates of their religious tenets, as is the case with Islamic polygamy, for example. Polyamorous and polyandrous marriages are, likewise, still prohibited.

In October 2009, Keith Bardwell, a Louisiana justice of the peace, refused to issue a marriage license to an interracial couple, prompting civil liberties groups, such as the NAACP and ACLU, to call for his resignation or firing. Bardwell resigned his office on November 3.

In the state of Pennsylvania, self-uniting marriage licenses are available which require only the signatures of the bride and groom and witnesses. Although this is an accommodation for a Quaker wedding, any couple is able to apply for it.

== Netherlands ==
In the Netherlands, couples intending to marry are required to register their intention beforehand, a process called "ondertrouw".

== Mexico ==
In Mexico, only civil marriage is recognized as legal. Persons wishing to do so may also have a religious ceremony, but it has no legal effect and does not replace in any way the legal binding civil marriage. A civil wedding in Mexico is fully valid for legal purpose in the U.S. The Mexican civil registry issues marriage certificates rather than marriage licenses because under Roman law, marriage is a legal right, which does not require a permit. Marriages are performed without charge at the premises of the "Registro Civil" at the municipal hall of most counties and state houses in Mexico.

== See also ==
- Banns of marriage
- Birth certificate
- Death certificate
- Marriage certificate
- Waiting period

People

- Robert Stewart Sparks, in charge of Los Angeles, California, marriage-license division, 20th century

== Sources ==
- Mark D. Herber, Ancestral Trails: The complete guide to British genealogy and family history, Sutton Publishing, 1997, ISBN 0-7509-1418-1
- C. R. Chapman & P. M. Litton, Marriage laws, rites, records and customs, Lochin Publishing, 1996
- National Conference of Commissioners on Uniform State Laws, American Uniform Marriage and Marriage License Act, Railway Printing Company, 1911 (Note, this is a "model act", not an actual law passed by Congress or individual states.) (Nor was this ever adopted by the Commission.)
- http://www.mexicolaw.com/Marriage%20in%20Mexico.htm
