= John de Gisburn =

Member of the Parliament of England

Thomas Graa

Member of the England Parliament for York
- In office 1360–1360
- Preceded by: Thomas Auguber/John de Sexdecim Vallibus (Sezevaux)/Roger de Henningham
- Succeeded by: William Graa
- In office 1373–1373
- Preceded by: William Graa//Robert Hawton
- Succeeded by: Thomas Graa/John Eshton

Personal details
- Born: 1336 York
- Died: 1390 (aged 53–54) York
- Spouse: Ellen
- Children: Alice; Isabel

John de Gisburn was a Member of Parliament for the constituency of York. During his career he also held the office of Lord Mayor of York.

== Life and politics ==
He was born in 1336 in the city of York. He married Ellen and they had two children, Alice and Isabel. He was Lord Mayor of York in 1371, 1372 and 1380.

John de Gisburn, also known as John Gisburn, was involved in factional disputes with other prominent merchants in the city of York during the 1380's. This led to him being chased out of his mayoral duties in 1380 by Simon Quixley. The Westminster government had to intervene to restore his position.

He died in York in 1390. He was survived by his wife who died around 1407/08. His daughter, Alice, married Sir William Plumpton, Constable of Knaresborough Castle, in 1382.

Political offices
Preceded by Thomas Auguber/John Sezevaux/Roger de Henningham	Member of Parliament; 1360	Next: William Graa

Political offices
Preceded by William Graa/Robert Hawton	Member of Parliament; 1373	Next: Thomas Graa/John Eshton
