= Black wedding =

Jewish wedding custom during epidemics

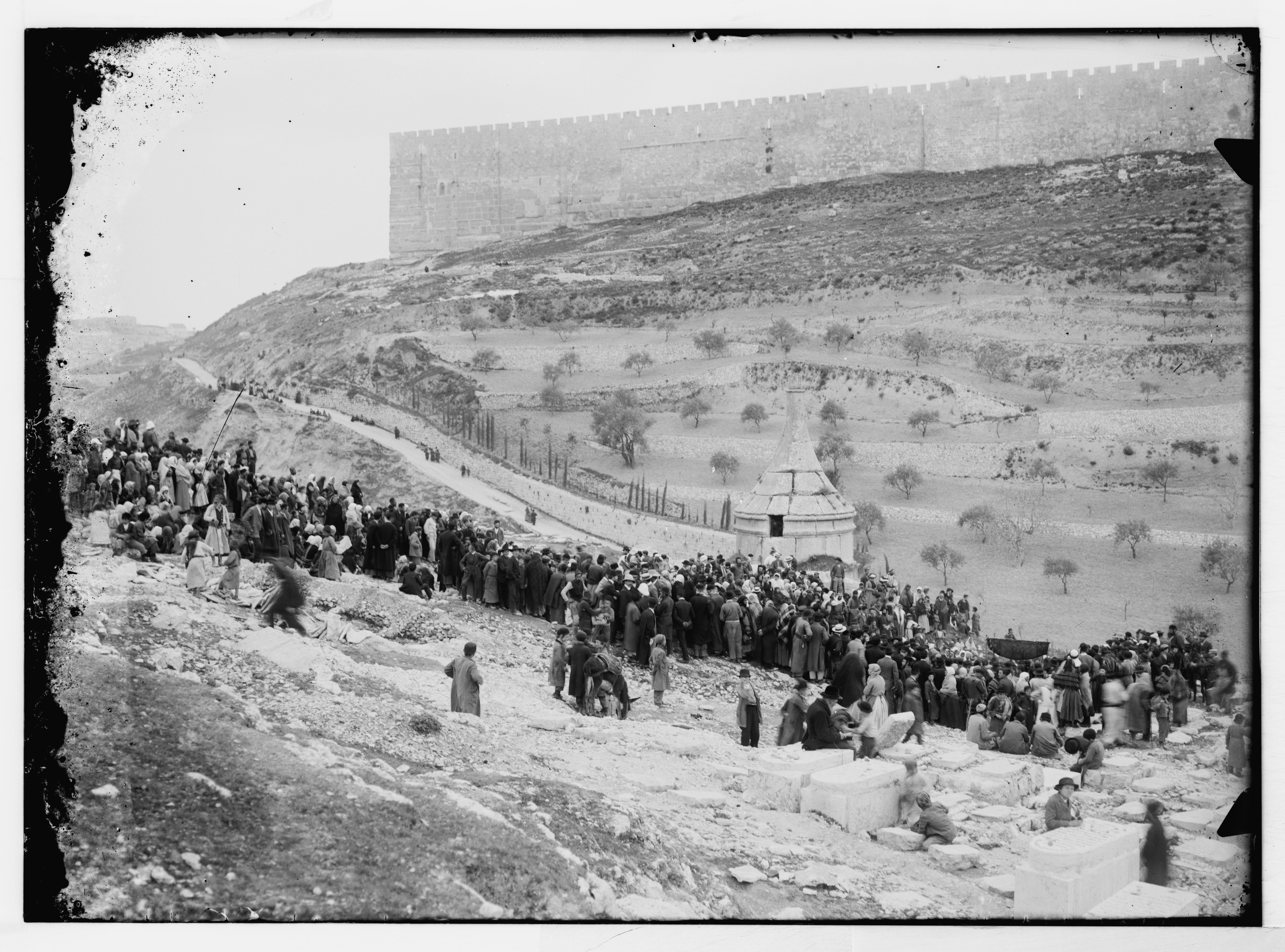
Black Wedding performed in the Mt. of Olives cemetery, c. 1905. Black chuppah can be seen at the right

A black wedding (Yiddish: shvartse khasene), or plague wedding (Yiddish: mageyfe khasene) is a Jewish custom consisting of a wedding performed in times of crisis, such as during epidemics. The bride and the groom, being either poor orphans, beggars, or disabled, were wed in an effort to ward-off diseases.

== Overview ==
The community who wants to perform this wedding selects the bride and groom. The two are either poor orphans, disabled, beggars or homeless and thus would have no reasonable chance of getting married by themselves. The wedding takes place at a cemetery and is financed by the community and the community pledges to support the couple. It is hoped that by performing this form of charity the souls of the deceased would reward their efforts and intercede to block the evil decree.

== Interpretations ==
Rokhl Kafrissen wrote for the Tablet magazine:

The cholera wedding didn’t have one single interpretation. For example, some rabbis felt it was efficacious because helping to marry off a needy bride was a great mitsve that would please God, all the more so for the marginal of the community who were unlikely to marry in any case. However, what comes across in many of the appalling descriptions of the forcibly married, and their reactions to each other, is that the act was far more callous than charitable. But it was enabled by traditional attitudes around communal charity. Those who had relied on it were seen as being, quite literally, property of the townspeople and thus had no say when their (previously reviled) bodies were needed to protect the town.

== History ==
Kafrissen wrote that "The first evidence of a plague wedding is from 1831, during Russia’s first cholera pandemic and then another written reference to one taking place in 1849 in Krakow. There isn’t much evidence of the weddings, however until the 1860s."

There were records of black weddings being performed in Jewish communities around the world. There was one performed on the Mount of Olives in 1909. Another was performed in 1918 in New York, during the Spanish flu.

According to Nathan Meir, "In the early 20th century, a new category of marginal persons appeared: those who carried the physical and mental scars of World War and pogroms. Meir notes that two of the last recorded cholera weddings happened in Odessa in 1922 and involved people who carried the wounds of those events: a woman with an eye gouged out by pogromists, a war veteran who had been wounded and lost the ability to speak."

A black wedding was performed in Bnei Brak in March 2020 during the COVID-19 pandemic.

== Bibliography ==
- Meir, Natan M. (2020). Stepchildren of the Shtetl. The Destitute, Disabled, and Mad of Jewish Eastern Europe, 1800-1939. Stanford University Press. ISBN 9781503613058.
