= Banns of marriage =

Official announcement of an upcoming marriage

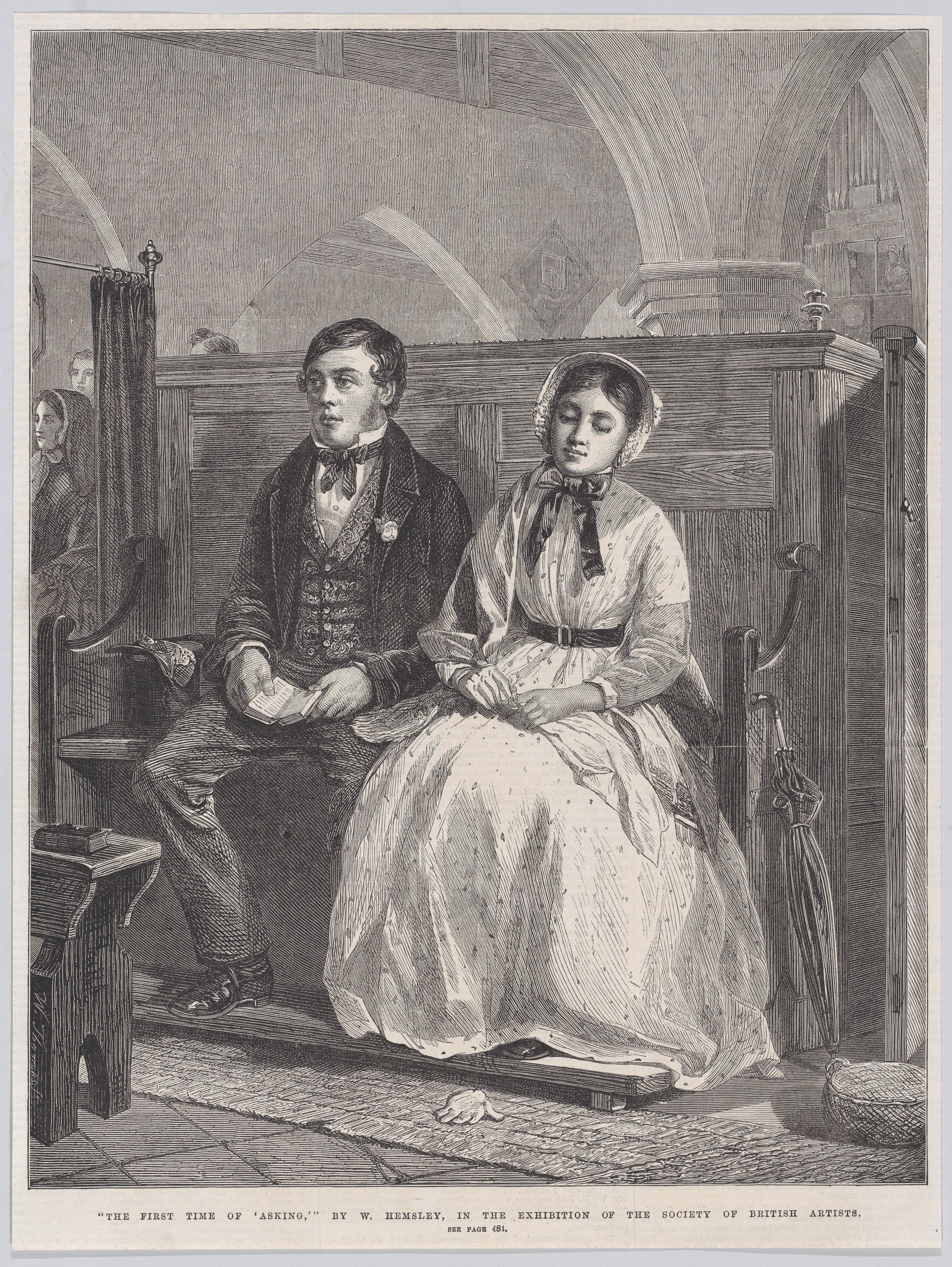
The First Time of 'Asking' (1869, after William Hemsley) — a Church of England couple listen as the banns for their marriage are read for the first time

The banns of marriage, commonly known simply as the "banns" or "bans" /ˈbænz/ (from a Middle English word meaning "proclamation", rooted in Frankish and thence in Old French), are the public announcement in a Christian parish church, or in the town council, of an impending marriage between two specified persons. It is commonly associated with the Catholic Church, the Church of Sweden (Lutheran), the Church of England (Anglican), and with other Christian denominations whose traditions are similar. In 1983, the Catholic Church removed the requirement for banns and left it to individual national bishops' conferences to decide whether to continue the practice, but in most Catholic countries the banns are still published.

The purpose of banns is to enable anyone to raise any canonical or civil legal impediments to the marriage, so as to prevent invalid marriages. Impediments vary between legal jurisdictions, but would normally include a pre-existing marriage that has been neither dissolved nor annulled, a vow of celibacy, lack of consent, or the couple being related within a prohibited degree of kinship.

== Historical overview ==
=== Catholic ===
The original Catholic Canon law on the subject, intended to prevent clandestine marriages, was decreed in Canon 51 of the Lateran IV Council in 1215; until then, the public announcement in church of marriages to be contracted was only made in some areas. The Council of Trent on 11 November 1563 (Sess. XXIV, De ref. matr., c. i) made the provisions more precise: before the celebration of any marriage, the names of the contracting parties should be announced publicly in the church during Mass, by the parish priests of both parties on three consecutive Holy Days. Although the requirement was straightforward in canon law, complications sometimes arose in a marriage between a Catholic and a non-Catholic, when one of the parties to the marriage did not have a home parish in the Roman Catholic Church.

Traditionally, banns were read from the pulpit and were usually published in the parish weekly bulletin. Before 1983, canon law required banns to be announced, or "asked", in the home parishes of both parties on three Sundays or Holy Days of Obligation before the marriage. Under Canon 1067 of the 1983 Code of Canon Law, the norms regarding the publication of banns are to be established by each individual national or regional Conference of bishops.

In some places, the words once spoken by the priest were: "I publish the banns of marriage between (Name of party) of the Parish of........ and (Name of other party) of this Parish. If any of you know cause or just impediment why these persons should not be joined together in Holy Matrimony, ye are to declare it. This is for the (first, second, third) time of asking."

Marriage licenses were introduced in the 14th century, to allow the usual notice period under banns to be waived, on payment of a fee and accompanied by a sworn declaration that there was no canonical impediment to the marriage.

=== Lutheran ===
In the Church of Sweden, the banns of marriage are announced during the "Notices", which follow the recitation of the Nicene Creed.

=== Anglican ===
While the Council of Trent is best known as a Counter-Reformation Council, neither the Lutheran Church nor the Church of England broke with the Roman Catholic Church on the requirement of publication of banns (or the equivalent) before marriage. (An equivalent notice was not required in the Orthodox Christian Churches, which used another method to verify eligibility to marry.) The break between some Protestants and the Roman Catholic Church was over what would constitute an impediment to marriage (the Church of England, for example, recognised remarriage after divorce in some circumstances), rather than over the means by which impediments to marriage should be identified.

In England, under the provisions of the Clandestine Marriages Act 1753 (26 Geo. 2. c. 33), a marriage was only legally valid if the banns had been called or a marriage licence had been obtained, codifying earlier practice within the Church of England. By this law, the banns were required to be read aloud on three Sundays before the wedding ceremony, in the home parish churches of both parties. Omission of this formality rendered the marriage void, unless the bishop's licence (a common licence) or the special licence of the Archbishop of Canterbury had been obtained. This statutory requirement had the effect of requiring Roman Catholics and other non-conformists to be married in the Church of England, a requirement lifted by legislation in 1836 (Marriage Act 1836).

Before 1754, when the Clandestine Marriages Act 1753 came into force, it was possible for eloping couples to be married clandestinely by an ordained clergyman (a favourite location was the Fleet Prison, a debtors' prison in London, in which clergymen willing to celebrate irregular marriages might be found). After the law, elopers had to leave England and Wales in order to contract a marriage while avoiding these formalities. Scotland, in particular Gretna Green, the first village over the border from England, was the customary destination, but became less popular after 1856 when Scottish law was amended to require 21 days' residence. The Isle of Man was briefly popular also, but in 1757 Tynwald, the island's legislature, passed a similar Act, with the additional sanction of pillorying and ear-cropping for clergymen from overseas who married couples without banns. These details often figure in melodramatic literature set in the period.

In 1656 (during the Commonwealth or Protectorate period) the parish register of St Mary le Crypt in Gloucester records banns of marriage as being "published by the Bellman" – the Town Crier.

The wording of banns according to the rites of the Church of England is as follows:

- I publish the banns of marriage between NN of ... and NN of ...
  - This is the first / second / third time of asking. If any of you know cause or just impediment why these two persons should not be joined in Holy Matrimony, ye are to declare it. (Book of Common Prayer 1662) or
  - This is the first / second / third time of asking. If any of you know any reason in law why they may not marry each other you are to declare it. (Common Worship 2000)

Royal assent was given to the "Church of England Marriage (Amendment) Measure" on 19 December 2012. Prior to that, as only the Prayer Book words were enshrined in the Marriage Act 1949, that wording should arguably have been used. However, in their notes to the 2012 Measure, the Church of England's legal Office stated "In some places the alternative form, as set out in Common Worship, has been in use for some time. There is no legal difficulty with marriages that have been solemnized following the publication of the banns in that form as the legal substance of the words is the same as the form contained in the Book of Common Prayer. However there will now be a statutory basis of the use of the alternative form."

The 2012 measure gave effect to two changes:

1. Statutory authority for the use of the form of words for the publication of banns contained in Common Worship: Pastoral Services (as an optional alternative to the form of words contained in the Book of Common Prayer);
2. Banns must be published on three Sundays at the 'principal service' (rather than as previously at 'morning service') and, as an option, they may additionally be published at any other service on those three Sundays.

=== Methodist ===
The Sunday Service of the Methodists, the first liturgical text of Methodism, contains "the opening rubric of the Prayer Book rite requiring the publication of banns, by which impediments to marriage such as consanguinity and legal betrothal to another could be revealed and investigated." These banns are to be read "over a period of three Sundays" during "the time of divine service".

The African Methodist Episcopal Church (through its publication of the 1996 Book of Discipline) and Free Methodist Church, both members of the World Methodist Council, contain a rubric for the reading of the banns:

First, the Banns of all that are to be married together, must be published in the congregation, three several Sundays, in the time of Divine Service (unless they be otherwise qualified according to law) the Minister saying after the accustomed manner, I PUBLISH the Banns of marriage between M of _____, and N of _____. If any of you know cause or just impediment why these two persons should not be joined together in holy Matrimony, ye are to declare it. This is the first, (second, or third) time of asking.

== Country-by-country overviews ==
=== England and Wales ===
The present legislation relating to banns of marriage is contained in the Marriage Act 1949 as amended by the Church of England Marriage (Amendment) Measure 2012.

=== United States ===
Banns were common requirement during the colonial era. Plymouth Colony's first marriage regulation (1636) required the banns to be read to the congregation three times, or if no congregation was in the area, publicly posted for a fifteen-day period. Quakers were allowed to announce banns in their meetinghouses. Noncompliance with the banns procedure carried a serious fine in the 17th century, which could be imposed upon the groom or minister. The proclaiming of the banns of marriage was also a requirement in the Dutch colony of New Netherland.

By the 19th and 20th centuries, the practice of announcing banns faded, as most religious denominations abandoned the practice or made it optional. Banns were superseded by the rise of civil marriage license requirements, which served a similar purpose: "a declaration that no legal impediment exists to the marriages." Elizabeth Freedman identifies the mid-19th century as the era in which "[g]overnmental regulation of marriage in the United States intensified" and the U.S. "reestablished jurisdiction over marriage by reviving the policing function that banns had once had, developing a series of prenuptial tests that would determine the fitness of the couple to marry..."

=== Canada ===
In the Canadian province of Ontario, the publication of banns "proclaimed openly in an audible voice during divine service" in the church(es) of the betrothed remains a legal alternative to obtaining a marriage licence. This was the procedure followed by the first few same-sex marriages in Ontario, since the province was not then issuing marriage licences to same-sex couples. The marriages were ruled valid in 2003. Banns being read once in a church ordinarily attended by both parties to the marriage is also allowed in lieu of a licence in Manitoba.

In the Canadian province of Quebec, equivalent formalities are required for all marriages, although the Civil code does not use the word "banns". The government does not issue licences; instead a written notice must be posted at the place of the wedding for 20 days beforehand, and the officiant verifies the eligibility of the intended spouses.

In British Columbia, only Doukhobors can be married by banns.

=== Civil-law countries in general ===
Many civil-law countries have different, secular pre-marriage registration and publication requirements.

=== Belgium ===
In Belgium the publication requirement was introduced in 1796 and removed in 2000.

=== Finland ===
In Finland, a forthcoming marriage was required to be announced in the home parish church of the bride on three consecutive Sundays prior to the wedding. This requirement ended with the 1988 marriage law, but the Evangelical Lutheran Church of Finland continues to practise the tradition unless the couple request otherwise. The Finnish term for the banns is kuulutus avioliittoon (literally 'announcement into marriage'), or kuulutukset more shortly and colloquially.

=== France ===
French civil law requires the publication of banns of marriage in the towns where intended spouses are living. It should be displayed in the town hall ten days before the marriage.

=== Germany ===
German civil law required the publication of banns of marriage until 1998. The process was called "das Aufgebot bestellen". Presently, couples must still register for civil marriage beforehand, which has the same effect of ruling out immediate marriage. Still, a public proclamation or posting isn't necessary anymore.

=== Netherlands ===
In the Netherlands, there is a statutory requirement for couples intending to marry to formally register that intention with officials beforehand. This process is called "ondertrouw".

== Other uses ==
A second use of "the banns" is as the prologue to a play, i.e., a proclamation made at the beginning of a medieval play announcing and summarizing the upcoming play. An example can be found in the Croxton Play of the Sacrament, a Middle English miracle play written sometime after 1461.
