= Quaker wedding =

Marriage ceremony of the Religious Society of Friends

Quaker weddings are the traditional ceremony of marriage within the Religious Society of Friends, sometimes called "marriage under the care of meeting". Quaker weddings are conducted in a similar fashion to regular Quaker meetings for worship, primarily in silence and without an officiant, as Quakers do not have clergy, or a rigid program of events, and therefore differ greatly from traditional Western weddings. In some respects a Quaker marriage resembles a common-law marriage.

== Quaker marriage in history ==
After the local meeting had approved the couple's intention, an announcement would be made and posted in the market on market day. Afterward, the wedding could take place. The wedding would occur at a meeting, and the couple would declare their intention to be married henceforth. The couple would have to be members of the same meeting: "marrying out of meeting" was prohibited; this might involve one of the pair changing meetings before the wedding. The marriage would be certified by all of the members of the meeting who were present, acting as both celebrants (after a fashion) and witnesses. Outsiders sometimes criticised Quaker couples for living in sin because they married each other without priests or ministers. George Fox, the founder of the Society of Friends, and Margaret Fell married using a modification of that procedure in 1669.

Two years later, when Fox was in Barbados, he sent out an epistle in which he advocated giving women's meetings the initial responsibility to pass on a couple's intentions when the couple had expressed a desire to be wed. That advice became quite controversial for those who did not want to see women's roles expanded.

== Quaker marriage today ==
When a couple decides to get married they declare their intentions to marry to the meeting (either in writing or in person). In many Yearly Meetings, the meeting then appoints a clearness committee to talk with the couple and make sure that they have properly prepared themselves for marriage. If the committee is clear that this couple is ready, it recommends that the monthly meeting should take the wedding "under their care" and appoint a committee to ensure the couple makes all the needed arrangements for the wedding ceremony. The duties vary but may include helping schedule the date, finding premarital counseling, making the Quaker marriage certificate, making sure the couple knows how to acquire and file any legal documents. In other Yearly Meetings, clearness committees are an option the couple can choose.

In America, some couples choose to marry within the meeting without registering their marriage with the government, a tradition dating back to Quakerism's earliest days. Meetings generally encourage couples to seek legal advice before undertaking this option. Common-law marriage, also called "marriage by habit and repute," by which a couple is legally married simply through cohabitation and by holding themselves out to the world to be husband and wife, is no longer a valid method of marriage in most American jurisdictions. If a couple later needs to prove that it is married, the Quaker wedding certificate signed by witnesses at the ceremony may be sufficient in some US states. A few states have statutes that specifically recognize Quaker marriages in which ministers are not officiants, as legal.

However, most Yearly Meetings and Monthly Meetings encourage Friends marrying under their care to obtain marriage licenses and have them signed by a representative of the Meeting and to file duly the licenses with the state. This is a special concern since common-law marriages, under which Quaker marriages were formerly valid in many states, are now legally recognized only in a few US states.

Same-sex couples can also be married with or without government documents in some meetings (see homosexuality and Quakerism).

== Procedure ==
A traditional wedding ceremony in a Friends meeting is similar to any other meeting for worship and therefore is often very different from the experience expected by non-Friends.

The attendees gather for silent worship, often with the couple sitting in front of the meeting (that may depend on the layout of the particular Friends meeting house). Out of the silence, the couple will exchange what the Philadelphia Yearly Meeting describes as "promises" and Britain Yearly Meeting describes as "declarations" with each other. The promises are short, simple, and egalitarian and can vary between different regions and meetings. Traditionally, Quakers do not swear or make oaths because they intend to tell the truth at all times, and thus have no need of swearing. (Note: The Quaker tradition of not swearing oaths is taken from Matthew 5:33–37.)

Since Friends traditionally have no clergy, there is no one person to "marry" them. Instead, they believe that they are married by God and declare their intentions before God and those gathered. They believe that the marriage is merely "witnessed" by those present. George Fox wrote in 1669:

For the right joining in marriage is the work of the Lord only, and not the priests' or the magistrates'; for it is God's ordinance and not man's; and therefore Friends cannot consent that they should join them together: for we marry none; it is the Lord's work, and we are but witnesses."

The administrative tasks associated with the marriage are completed by a Registering Officer, who is a person specially appointed by the Monthly Meeting in which the couple is to be married. However, that person is responsible purely for the administration of matters such as the certificate and does not "marry" the couple.

Usually, there are no bridesmaids or other special roles in the wedding other than that of the bride and the groom.

The couple then signs the Quaker wedding certificate. All those present are invited to give ministry with the gathered meeting as they feel led, as in any other meeting for worship. At the close of worship, all who are present at the meeting are asked to sign the wedding certificate as witnesses. Often, the certificate is hung prominently in the home of the couple as a reminder of the declarations it made and of the people with whom it shared that moment.

=== United Kingdom ===
==== Declarations ====
The declarations made by the couple in meetings for worship for the solemnisation of marriage in Britain Yearly Meeting are as follows (words in italics are optional):

In the presence of God (OR In the fear of the Lord and in the presence of this assembly), Friends, I take this my friend NAME to be my spouse, promising, through divine assistance (OR with God's help), to be unto him/her a loving and faithful spouse, so long as we both on earth shall live (OR until it shall please the Lord by death to separate us)

The word "spouse" may be replaced by "wife", "husband" or "partner in marriage". The declarations may also be made in Welsh.

==== Law ====
Quaker marriage has been subject of special law in England and Wales since the 18th century. The first Marriage Act 1753, which regulated the legal and civic recognition of marriage, recognised only marriages conducted by the "Society of Friends", Jews and the Church of England and removed recognition of common-law marriage or marriage conducted by any other religious group. Thus, Quakers' marriages were legally recognised though marriages within other non-conformist traditions were not legally recognised.

The special exemption for Quakers has continued in subsequent Marriage Acts in England and Wales up to and including the Marriage Act 1949, which allows "marriage in according to the usages of the Society of Friends, commonly called Quakers". Quakers and Jews were exempt from the restrictions within the Marriage Act 1949 from the requirements to marry in certain approved locations or at certain times and so they were the only groups who were (theoretically) allowed, for example, to marry outdoors or in the middle of the night (although in practice, Quaker marriages are performed in a place where there is a regular Meeting for Worship held and so they would not usually take place outside).

The law with regard to Quaker weddings in England and Wales is based around Section 47 of the Marriage Act 1949 Marriages according to usages of the Society of Friends.

Quaker marriages in England and Wales have two marriage certificates:

- The Quaker marriage certificate is a large document which sets out the couple's names, the procedure they have followed and the declarations made. It is signed by the couple and by all who were present at the meeting for worship for solemnisation of the marriage. This is a requirement of Britain Yearly Meeting and is kept by the couple but is not normally recognised by any organisation outside of the Religious Society of Friends.
- The Quaker civil marriage certificate is the certificate recognised by the government and also by institutions such as banks. It is completed by the Registering Officer of the Area Meeting in which the marriage is taking place, and it is signed by the couple and four witnesses. It is similar in format to the marriage certificate of the Church of England or a civil wedding although of a specific design stating that the marriage took place "according to the usages of the Society of Friends".

Quakers decided to offer marriage on an equal basis to same-sex couples in 2009. Same-sex marriage was recognized in law in 2014 in England, Scotland and Wales.

=== United States ===
==== Law ====
A governmental marriage license is not usually part of the ceremony and can be signed at a separate time if that is desired. In many areas, the license must be signed by an "officiant", which in most cases is one or more members of an oversight committee. In the District of Columbia and the states of Pennsylvania, Wisconsin, Illinois, Colorado, and California, self-uniting marriage licenses are available, which require only the signatures of the bride, the groom, and witnesses.

Most, if not all, states provide by statute that a few members of the Meeting, who are duly appointed by name under its normal business procedure, are thereby legally competent to jointly sign and file the marriage license as the "officiants". Since Friends meetings have traditionally considered a wedding (and indeed the entire marriage) of their members to be under their pastoral care, creating such an "oversight committee" for the wedding is fairly standard, even regardless of any such statute.

== See also ==
- Christian views of marriage
- Ketubah (Jewish marital contract)
- Nikah (Muslim marital contract)
