= William Selby (died c.1426) =

English Member of Parliament (died c. 1426)

William Selby (died c. 1426), of York, was an English Member of Parliament (MP).

He was a Member of the Parliament of England for City of York in February 1383, April 1384, 1391, 1395 and January 1397. He was Mayor of York 3 February 1385–6, 1387–9.
