= Self-uniting marriage =

Marriage without the presence of a third-party officiant

A self-uniting marriage is one in which the couple are married without the presence of a third-party officiant. Although non-denominational, this method of getting married is sometimes referred to as a "Quaker marriage", after the marriage practice of the Religious Society of Friends.

== United States ==
=== Alabama ===
In Alabama, a law was passed in 2019 which abolished the issuance of marriage licenses and repealed a requirement for solemnization. Instead, couples of legal age are allowed to jointly fill out a marriage certificate, have their certificate notarized by two notaries public, and submit their certificate to an Alabama judge, who is required to accept their certificate. The abolition of both licenses and mandated solemnization de facto allowed for self-uniting marriages in the state.

=== California ===
California allows "non-clergy marriage" by "members of a particular religious society or denomination not having clergy for the purpose of solemnizing marriage or entering the marriage relation" if specified forms, including the signatures of two witnesses, are properly completed and filed. An atheist couple in San Francisco was reportedly allowed to have a non-clergy marriage under this provision of California law by entering "atheist" in the box for "religious society or denomination" on the non-clergy marriage form.

=== Colorado ===
Colorado allows self-solemnization without requiring a special form of application or witnesses. Colorado is one of two states that allow self-solemnization without any caveats or restrictions. With self solemnizations, these requirements are cut out, and when a couple gets married in Colorado, they can have their own ceremony and sign their own marriage license.

=== District of Columbia ===
The District of Columbia allows couples to officiate their own wedding.

=== Illinois ===
Illinois law states, "if no individual acting alone solemnized the marriage, both parties to the marriage, shall complete the marriage certificate form and forward it to the county clerk within 10 days after such marriage is solemnized." Nonetheless, such weddings must be "in accordance with the prescriptions of any religious denomination, Indian Nation or Tribe or Native Group."

=== Kansas ===
Kansas law provides, "The two parties themselves, by mutual declarations that they take each other as husband and wife, in accordance with the customs, rules and regulations of any religious society, denomination or sect to which either of the parties belong, may be married without an authorized officiating person." And further provides that, "All marriages solemnized among the society called Friends, or Quakers, in the form previously practiced and in use in their meetings shall be good and valid and shall not be construed as affected by any of the foregoing provisions of this act."

=== Maine ===
Maine exempts "Quakers or Friends" and "members of the Baháʼí faith" from the requirement for a third-party officiant.

=== Nevada ===
Nevada law provides, "All marriages solemnized among the people called 'Friends' or 'Quakers,' in the forms heretofore practiced and in use in their meetings, shall be good and valid."

=== Pennsylvania ===
Pennsylvania has recognized such marriages for centuries (due to its Quaker origins and history of religious tolerance) and has offered licenses for these marriages for decades. These marriages only require the signatures of two witnesses in place of an officiant.

The issuance of self-uniting marriage licenses has been controversial, however. Before 2007, some Pennsylvania counties did not offer this form of license at all. Others only allowed such marriages when license applicants could prove they were members of a recognized religion without clergy, such as Quakers, the Amish, and the Baháʼí Faith; however, in 2007, a Federal judge ruled that a Pennsylvania couple that was denied a self-uniting marriage on the basis of their secular beliefs must be allowed such a license.

=== Wisconsin ===
Wisconsin allows self-uniting marriages in accordance with the customs, rules and regulations of any religious society, denomination or sect to which either of the parties may belong. The county clerk may ask the applicants to state their religious affiliation and provide evidence of that affiliation. Secular humanism is an acceptable religious affiliation for obtaining a self-uniting marriage license.

== See also ==
- Gandharva marriage
- Marriage in the Catholic Church § Western Church: in certain cases, it can do without an officiating priest, but two witnesses are always required
