= William Hemsley (politician) =

American politician

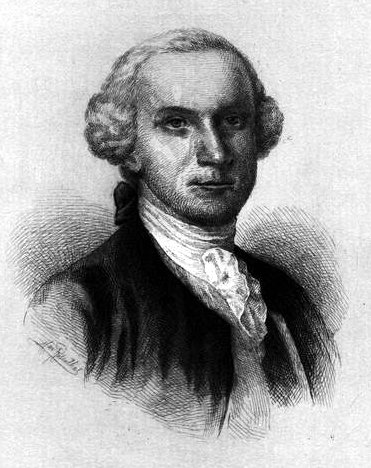
- Etching of William Hemsley (by Max Rosenthal, c. 1885)

Member of the Maryland Senate from the Eastern Shore district
- In office November 6, 1786 – December 22, 1790
- In office November 1, 1779 – June 27, 1781

Delegate to the Congress of the Confederation from Maryland
- In office September 28, 1782 – November 1, 1783

Personal details
- Born: January 23, 1737
- Died: June 5, 1812 (aged 75) Clover Fields Farm, Queen Anne's County, Maryland, United States
- Children: William Hemsley (1766–1825)
- Parents: William Hemsley (1703–1736) (father); Anna Maria Tilghman (1709–1763) (mother)

Military service
- Rank: Colonol

William Hemsley (January 23, 1737 – June 5, 1812) was an American planter and political leader from Maryland. He represented Maryland in the Continental Congress in 1782 and 1783.

Hemsley's entire life was closely connected with his family's plantation, Clover Fields Farm, in Queen Anne's County on Maryland's Eastern Shore. The family had been established there and in Talbot County for several generations. His career in public service was similar to that of many prominent planters. He was a county official in both counties at various times and served as a colonel in the militia of Queen Anne's County during the Revolutionary War. He was a delegate to the Maryland State Convention of 1788, to vote whether Maryland should ratify the proposed Constitution of the United States.

Hemsley was first elected to the Maryland state senate in November 1779. He would serve in that body until 1781. Then in 1782–1783, he served in the Continental Congress in New York. He was again elected to the state senate in 1784 but declined that election. He would serve again from 1786 to 1789. Although re-elected again in 1790, he did not serve. He was a member of the Maryland Convention that ratified the United States Constitution on April 28, 1788.

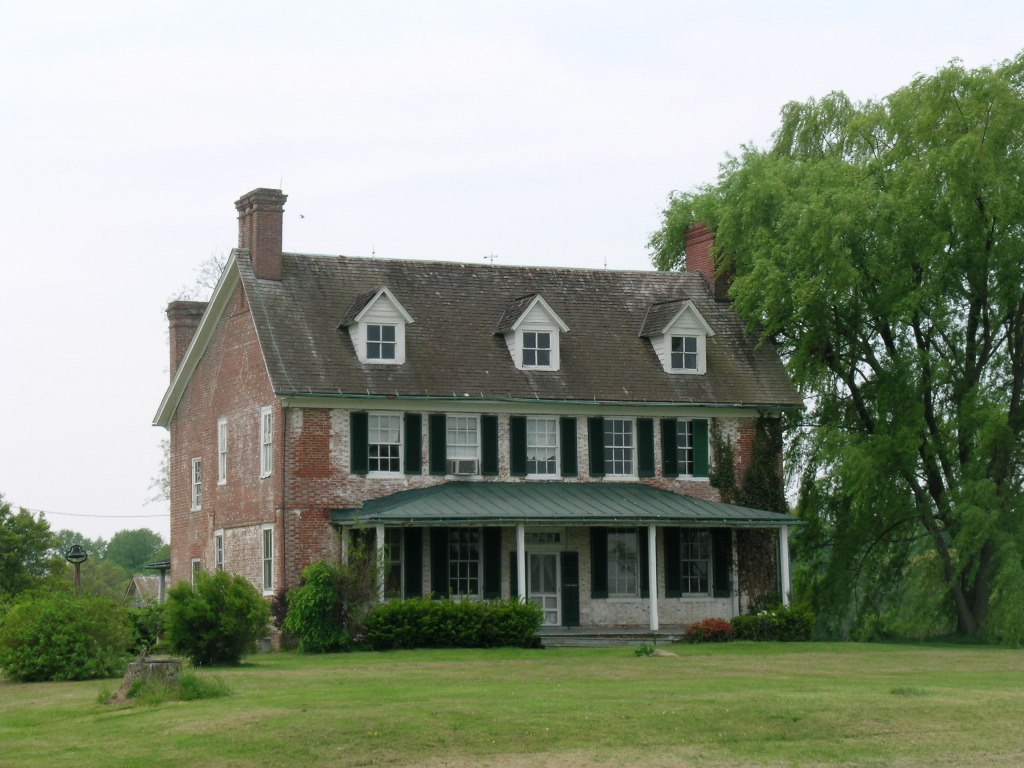
Clover Fields Farm in 2005

His later years were spent running the family plantation. He died there on June 5, 1812, and was buried in the family's cemetery on the farm, near Queenstown, Maryland. His son, William Hemsley Jr., also served in the state senate in 1799–1800.
