= John Howden (MP for City of York) =

English Member of Parliament (died c. 1406)

John Howden (died c. 1406), of York, was an English Member of Parliament (MP). He was married, at some point by May 1368, to a woman named Juliana. She was possibly a daughter of John Archibald of York, and together they had possibly one son, and they had one daughter.

Howden was Mayor of York 3 February 1386–7. He was a Member of the Parliament of England for City of York in the Parliaments of November 1384, February and September 1388, and 1391.
