= William Hemsley (painter) =

English painter

- Born: London
- Died: 24 December 1906 (aged 89); London
- Known for: genre painting
- Children: 3

William Hemsley RBA (London 1817 or 1819 – 24 December 1906 London) was a British artist who specialised in genre paintings.

== Biography ==
William was born in London, the son of architect William Whitfield Hemsley (1796–1867) and Caroline Amelia Hemsley, née Jones (1797–1872). He was sent away to preparatory school in Brighton at a young age, and began to develop an interest in art through painting portraits as a teenager. Upon his return to London, he began to train in his father's profession and found employment as a drawing clerk in the office of John Crake. However, he continued to be drawn to art, and left early in his career in order to paint professionally. He began to exhibit at artistic societies, and his works were regularly reviewed in The Art Journal. Hemsley's technique was compared to the Dutch style, but attention was also drawn to his "love for fun." Many of his works depicted rustic domestic scenes, leading to him being described as "pre-eminently the painter of cottage life."

In 1859, Hemsley was elected to the Society of British Artists, and served as the vice president of the organisation, which later became the Royal Society of British Artists (RBA), for many years. He was also a steward of the Artists' General Benevolent Institution.

For most of his adult life, Hemsley resided in London, including at 5 Marlborough Street, and at addresses in Chelsea and South Kensington. He also undertook numerous study trips abroad, including to France and Holland. He died on 24 December 1906, aged 89, at the home of his youngest son in south London, Walter Howard Hemsley (d. 1912). He was buried at Brompton Cemetery in west London.

== Exhibitions ==
Between the years of 1848 and 1880, Hemsley exhibited 120 works in major London exhibitions, at the Royal Academy, the British Institution and the Society of British Artists' Suffolk Street gallery. A number of his paintings were featured at the 1862 International Exhibition and the Exposition universelle de 1867, world's fairs held in London and Paris respectively, as well as at other British galleries including Manchester Art Gallery and Liverpool's Walker Art Gallery. Prints, usually wood-engravings, after his paintings appeared in the Illustrated London News, Illustrated News of the World, and The Art Journal.

Today, Hemsley's paintings can be found at the Wellcome Library in London, and as part of public collections in Bath, Birkenhead, Hull, Leeds, Southport, and Wolverhampton.

== Selected paintings ==
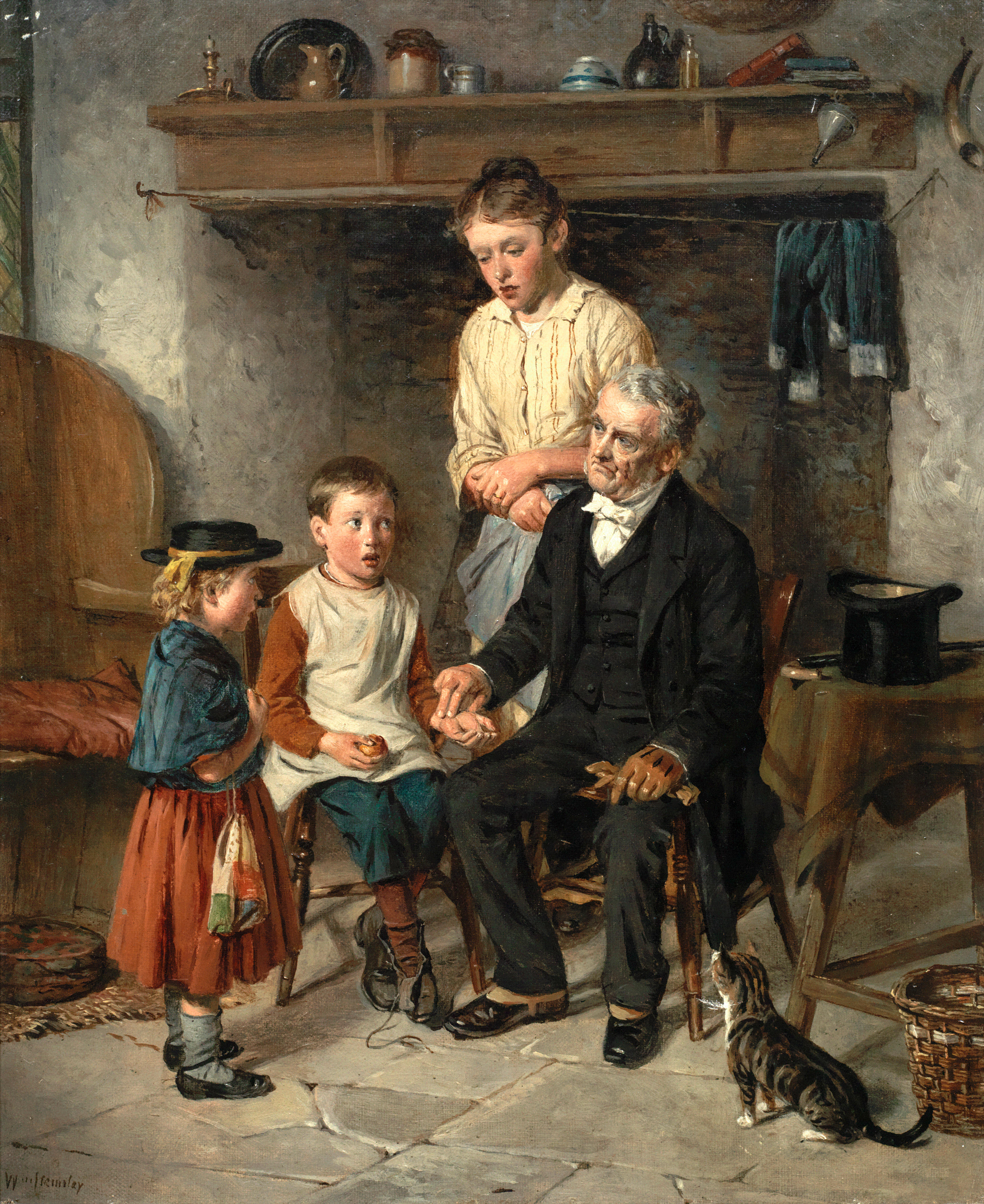
A Sham

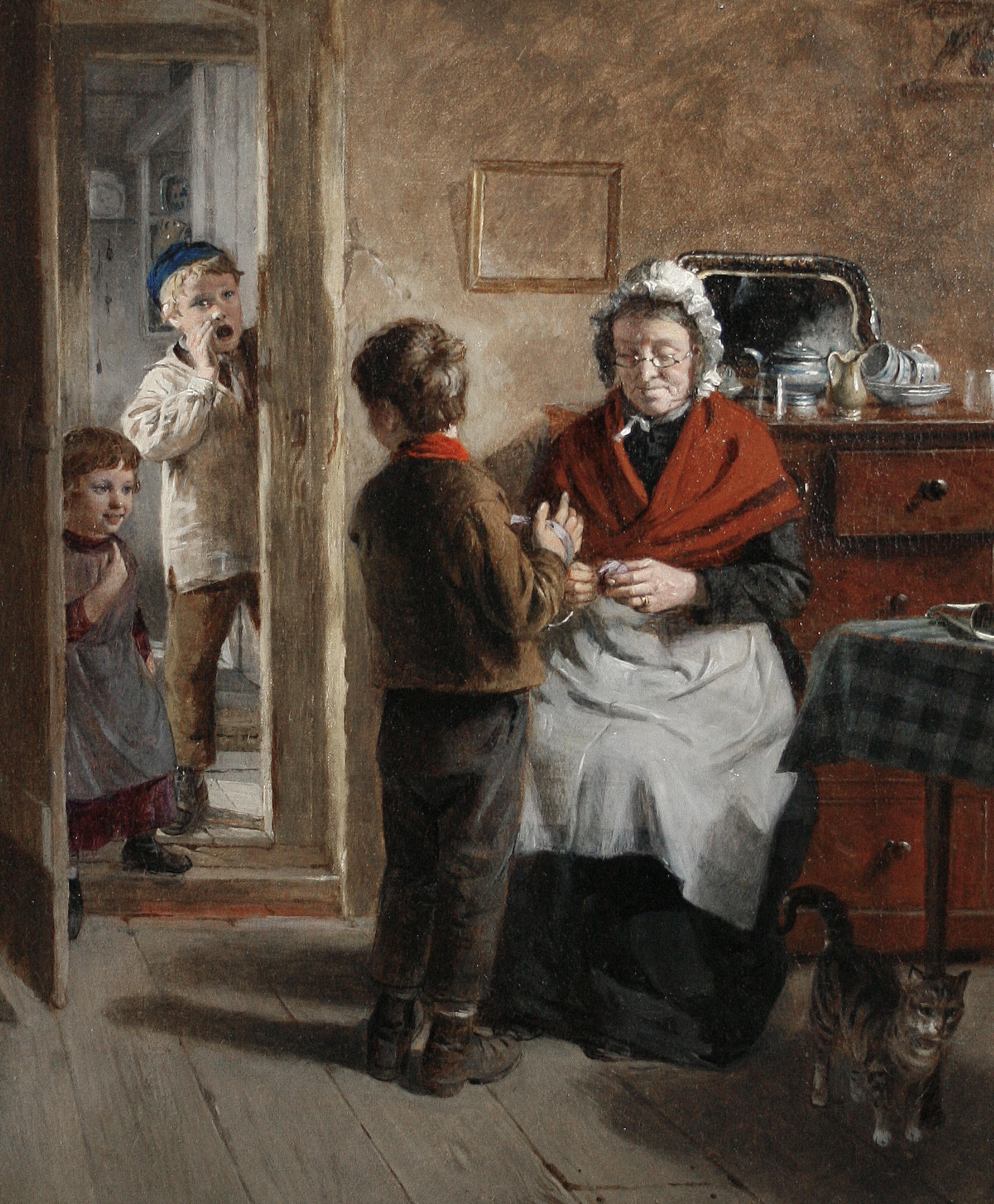
Divided Attention

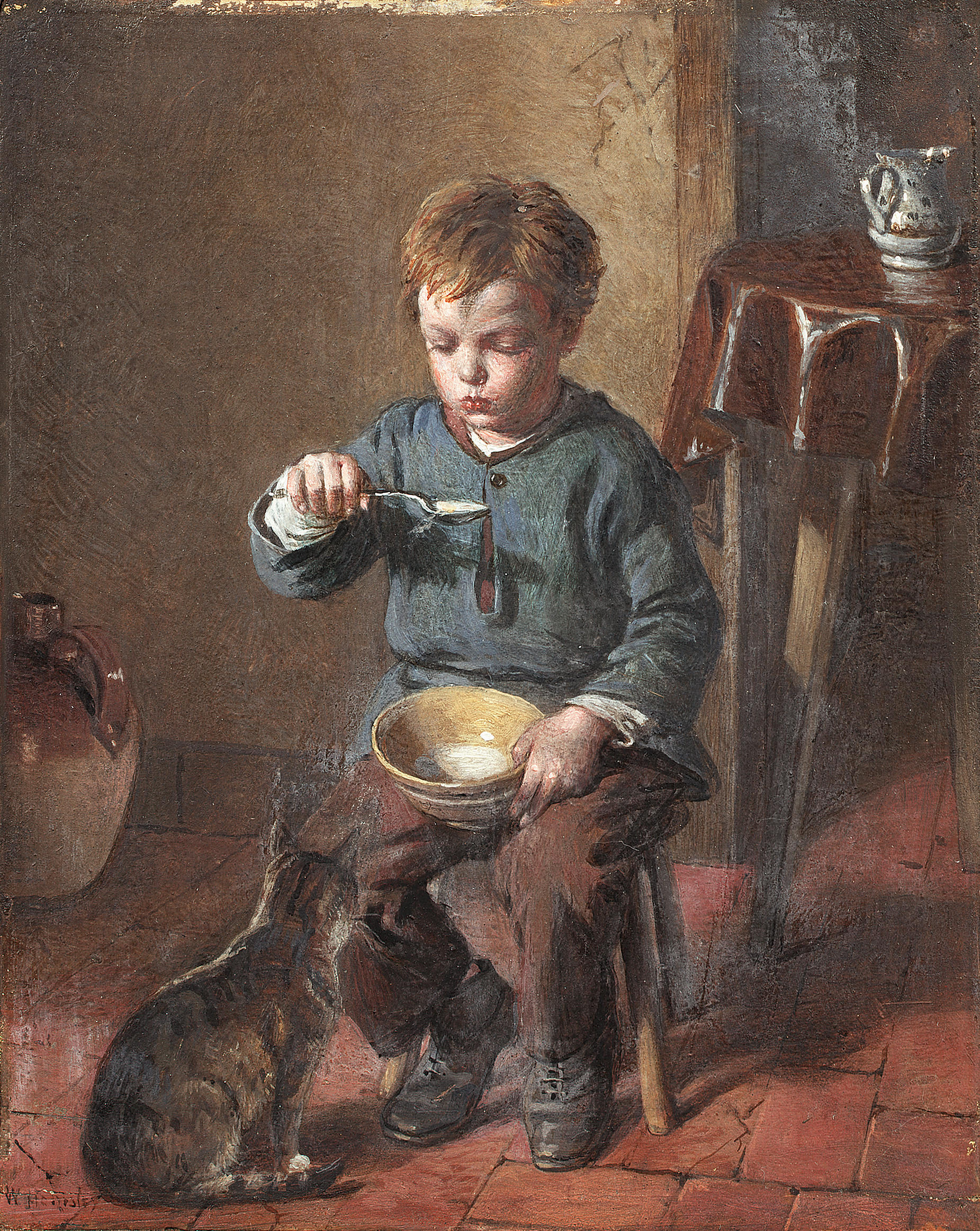
Porridge

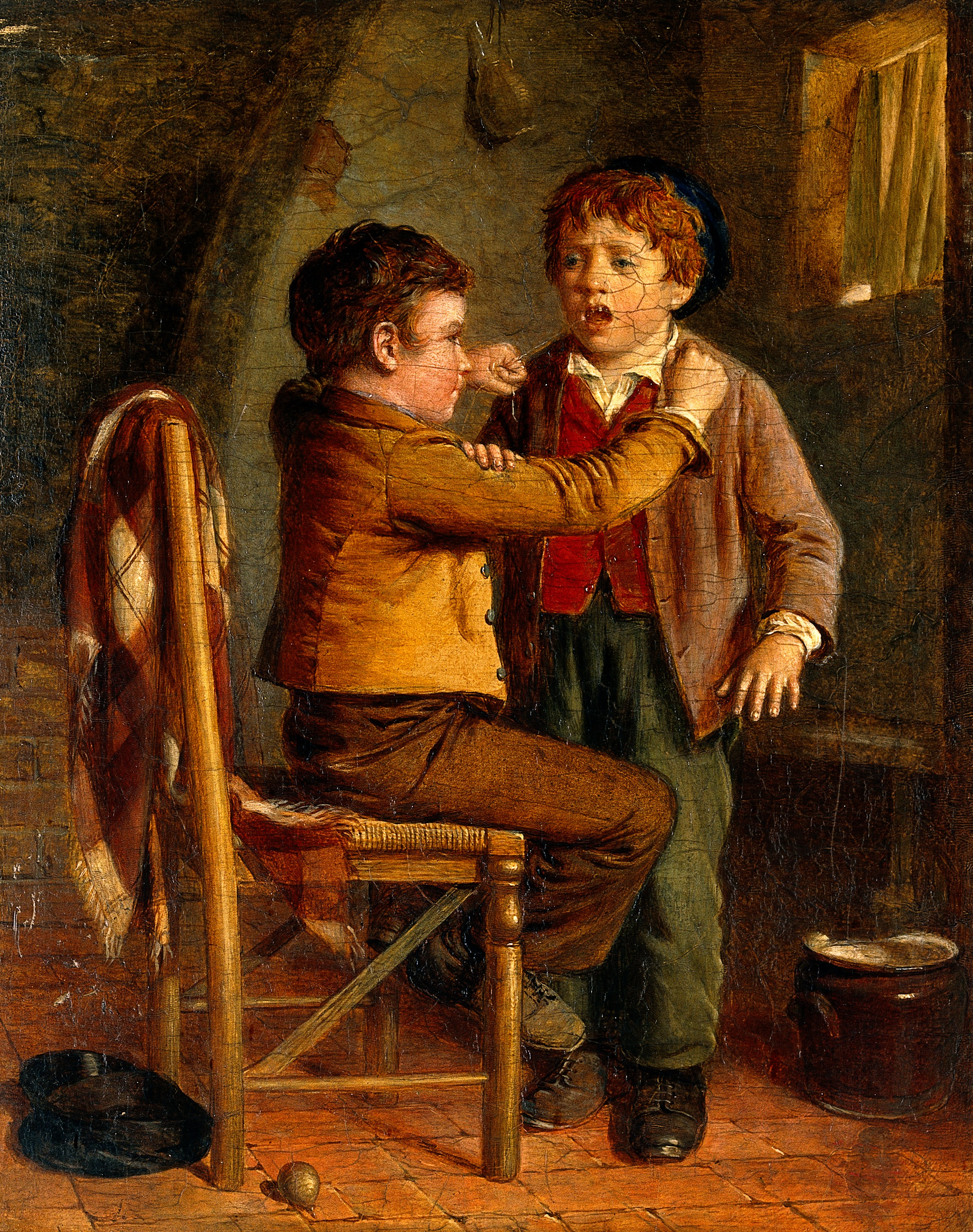
The Young Dentist

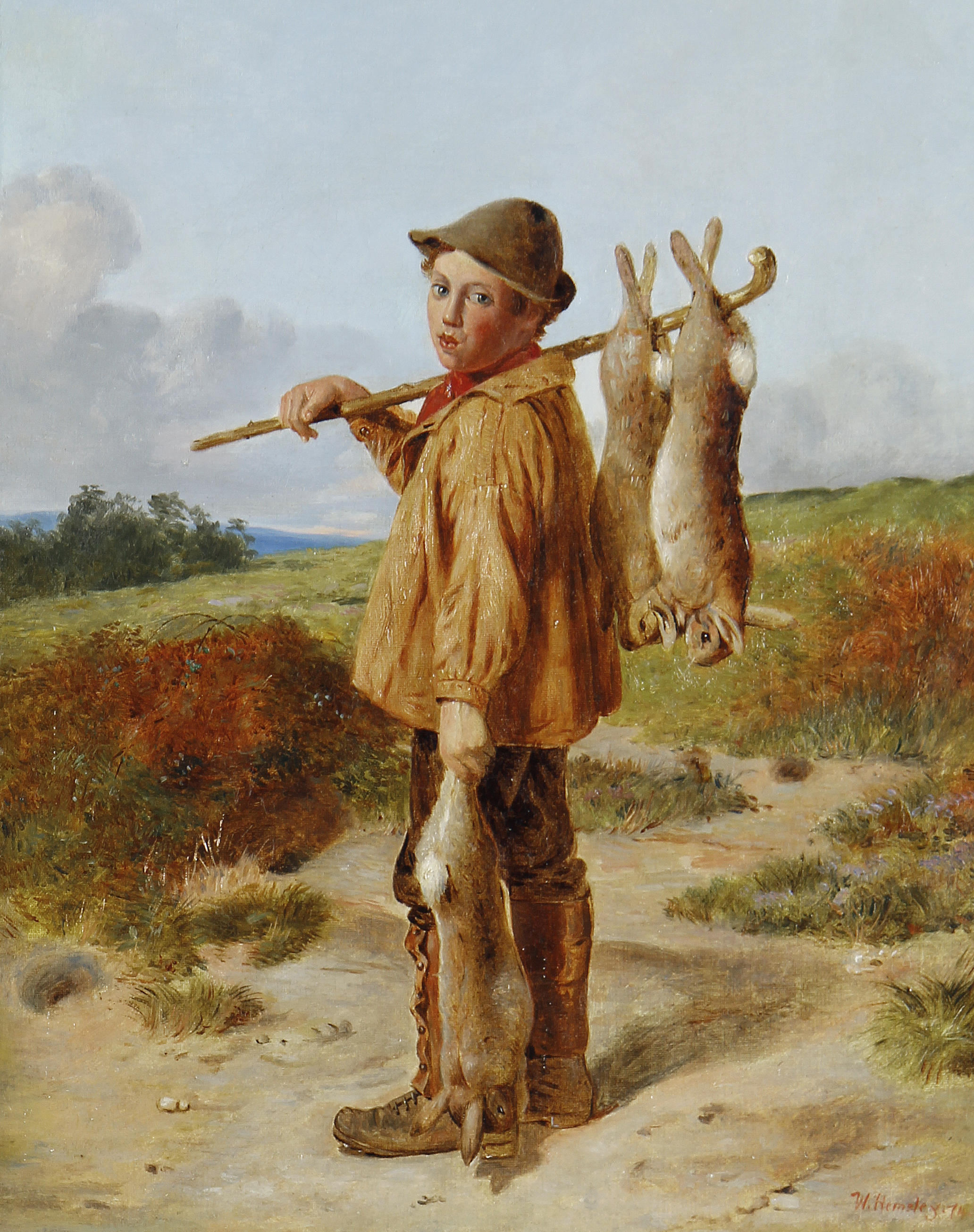
The Young Poacher
