= List of Quakers =

This is a list of notable people associated with the Religious Society of Friends, also known as Quakers, who have a Wikipedia article. The first part consists of individuals known to be or to have been Quakers continually from some point in their lives. The second part consists of individuals whose parents were Quakers or who were Quakers themselves at one time in their lives, but then converted to another religion, or who formally or informally distanced themselves from the Society of Friends, or who were disowned by their Friends Meeting.

== Quakers ==
=== A ===
- Elisabeth Abegg (1882–1974), German educator who rescued Jews during the Holocaust
- Damon Albarn (b. 1968), English musician, singer-songwriter and record producer
- Thomas Aldham (c. 1616–1660), English Quaker instrumental in setting up the first meeting in the Doncaster area
- Horace Alexander (1889–1989), English writer on India and friend of Gandhi
- Darina Allen (b. 1948), cooking writer, educator and television chef
- Diane Allen (b. 1948), American politician and journalist
- Myrtle Allen (1924–2018), cook, "Matriarch of Irish cuisine"
- William Allen (1770–1843), English scientist, philanthropist, and abolitionist
- Edgar Anderson (1897–1969), American botanist
- Charlotte Anley (1796–1893), English novelist and writer
- Elizabeth Ashbridge (1713–1755), English Quaker preacher and memoirist
- Alison Ashby (1901–1987), Australian botanical artist and plant collector.
- Edwin Ashby (1861–1941), Australian property developer, malacologist, and ornithologist
- Sa'ed Atshan (born 1984), Palestinian-American anthropologist and academic
- Ann Austin (17th century), early English Quaker missionary
- Iwao Ayusawa (鮎沢巌, 1894–1972), Japanese diplomat

=== B ===
- Edmund Backhouse (1824–1906), English banker and MP of Parliament for Darlington
- James Backhouse (1794–1869), UK-born Australian botanist and missionary
- Edmund Bacon (1910–2005), American architect
- Ernest Bader (1890–1982), Swiss-born English businessman and philanthropist
- Joan Baez (b. 1941), American folk singer and peace campaigner
- Eric Baker (1920–1976), English co-founder of Amnesty International and the Campaign for Nuclear Disarmament
- Emily Greene Balch (1867–1961), American Nobel Peace Prize winner
- Caroline Balderston Parry (1945 – Feb 11, 2022), Canadian writer, musician, performer, celebrator, and consultant
- Chris Barber (1921–2012), English businessman and chairman of Oxfam
- Robert Barclay (1648–1690), Scottish theologian
- John Henry Barlow (1855–1924), English Quaker statesman
- Geoffrey Barraclough (1908–1984), English historian
- Florence Mary Barrow (1876–1964), aid worker and housing reform activist
- Bernard Barton (1784–1849), English poet
- John Barton (1755–1789), English abolitionist
- John Bartram (1699–1777), American botanist
- William Bates (d. 1700), a founder of Newton Colony, the third English colony in West Jersey
- Elizabeth Bathurst (1655–1685), English theologian and preacher
- Helen Bayes (b. 1944), UK-born Australian child rights activist
- Joel Bean (1825–1914), American Quaker minister
- Anthony Benezet (1713–1784), American educator, abolitionist
- Caleb P. Bennett (1758–1836), American soldier and politician
- Douglas C. Bennett (b. 1946), American academic, president of Earlham College
- Lewis Benson (1906–1986), American printer, expert in Early Quakerism, especially George Fox
- Anna McClean Bidder (1903–2001), English marine zoologist and founder of Lucy Cavendish College, Cambridge
- Hester Biddle (c. 1629–1697), English pamphleteer and preacher
- Albert Bigelow (1906–1993), American nuclear weapons protester
- J. Brent Bill (b. 1951), American recorded minister and writer on religion
- Linda Bilmes (b. 1960), co-author of The Three Trillion Dollar War, professor at Harvard Kennedy School; co-chair Economists for Peace and Security.
- George Birkbeck (1776–1841), one of the English founders of London Mechanics Institute, now Birkbeck, University of London
- Sarah Blackborow (fl. 1650s – 1660s), English tractarian prominent in discussion of the role of women in the Society and of social issues
- Barbara Blaugdone (c. 1609–1705), English autobiographer and minister
- Sir Richard Body (1927–2018), Conservative MP from 1955 to 1959 and from 1966 to 2001, prominent Eurosceptic, and writer on agricultural matters
- Taylor A. Borradaile (1885–1977), chemist and one of the four founders and first President of the Phi Kappa Tau fraternity; two of the founding principles of Phi Kappa Tau are also two of the Quaker testimonies: Integrity and Equality
- Elise Boulding (1920–2010), Norwegian-born American educator, sociologist, prominent in the 20th-century peace research movement
- Kenneth E. Boulding (1910–1993), English economist, educator, poet, and interdisciplinary philosopher
- Bathsheba Bowers (1671–1718), American religious author and preacher
- Samuel Bownas (1676–1753), English travelling minister and writer
- John Bowne (1627–1695), English-born promoter of religious freedom in colonial America
- Sandra Boynton (b. 1953), American writer, cartoonist and composer
- Bertha Bracey (1893–1989), English teacher and aid worker
- George Bradshaw (1801–1853), English cartographer, printer, publisher and originator of the railway guide
- John Bright (1811–1889), English politician
- Charlie Brooker (b. 1971), English satirist and broadcaster
- Edmund Wright Brooks (1834–1928), English philanthropist and cement maker
- Elizabeth Brown (1830–1899), English astronomer and meteorologist
- Moses Brown (1738–1836), American industrialist and philanthropist
- Jocelyn Bell Burnell (b. 1943), Northern Irish astrophysicist
- Edward Burrough (1634–1663), English member of the Valiant Sixty
- Smedley D. Butler (1881–1940), Major General in the United States Marine Corps and author of War is a Racket
- Thomas S. Butler (1855–1928), American congressman
- Charles Roden Buxton (1875–1942), British Member of Parliament

=== C ===
- George Cadbury (1839–1922), English chocolatier
- Henry Cadbury (1883–1974), American writer and chairman of the American Friends Service Committee
- John Cadbury (1801–1889), English chocolatier
- Richard Tapper Cadbury (1768–1860), English draper, abolitionist, philanthropist
- Ruth Cadbury (b. 1959), British Member of Parliament
- David Cadman (b. 1941), English economist and writer
- Mary Greig Campbell (1907–1989), New Zealand librarian and China relief worker
- Arthur Capper (1865–1951), governor and American senator from Kansas
- Mary Capper (1755–1835), English Quaker minister and writer
- Mary Birkett Card, (1774–1817), abolitionist and feminist poet
- Thomas Carpenter (1752–1847), fighting Quaker who served in the Revolutionary War and afterward as a glassmaker
- Pierre Cérésole (1879–1945), Swiss founder of Service Civil International
- Whittaker Chambers (1901–1961), American ex-communist, ex-Soviet spy who converted to Quakerism
- Sarah Cheevers (1608–1664), evangelist
- Henry Christy (1810–1865), English banker, philanthropist and anthropologist
- Cyrus Clark (fl. 1825–1863), English co-founder of C&J Clark, shoe manufacturers in Street, Somerset
- William Coddington (1601–1678), first governor of Rhode Island
- Levi Coffin (1798–1877), American abolitionist
- Elizabeth Coggeshall (1770–1851), American minister who visited meetings throughout the United States, the British Isles, and European continent.
- John S. Collins (1837–1928), American land developer
- Peter Collinson FRS (1694–1768), English botanist
- John Conard (1773–1857), American politician nicknamed the "Fighting Quaker", buried in an Episcopal Church graveyard
- Anne Finch Conway (1631–1679), English philosopher
- William Cookworthy (1705–1780), Quaker minister and pharmacist who developed the first true hard-paste porcelain ("china") in the UK
- Cassius Marcellus Coolidge (1844–1934), American artist who painted Dogs Playing Poker
- William Cooper (1754–1809), founder of Cooperstown, New York and father of author James Fenimore Cooper
- James A. Corbett (1933–2001), American human-rights campaigner
- Pit Corder (1918–1990), English applied linguist
- Stephen Cox, British writer
- Isaac Crewdson (1780–1844), English Quaker minister and founder of the Evangelical Friends or Beaconites
- Stephen Crisp (1628–1692), English writer and recorded Quaker minister, also in the Low Countries
- Joseph Crosfield (1792–1844), English industrialist
- James Cudworth (1817–1899), steam locomotive designer
- Adam Curle (1916–2006), first professor of peace studies at the University of Bradford

=== D ===
- Carla Denyer (b. 1985), British Member of Parliament, Former Co-Leader of the Green Party of England and Wales
- John Dalton (1766–1844), English chemist
- Abraham Darby I (1678–1717), English ironmaster
- Abraham Darby II (1711–1763), English ironmaster
- Abraham Darby III (1750–1791), English ironmaster
- James Dean (1931–1955), American actor
- Judi Dench (b. 1934), English actress
- Philip Dennis, agriculture missionary to the Miami Nation
- Caleb Deschanel (b. 1944), American cinematographer
- William Dewsbury (1671–1688), English Quaker minister
- Jonathan Dickinson (1663–1722), Jamaican-born colonial American merchant and politician
- Richard Dillingham (1823–1850), American abolitionist
- Ambrose Dixon (1619–1687), colonial American
- Dorcas Dole (fl. later 17th century), English pamphleteer and sectary
- Stephen Donaldson (1946–1996), English prison and LGBT activist
- Edward Doubleday (1811–1849), English entomologist and ornithologist
- Henry Doubleday (1808–1875), English entomologist and ornithologist
- Henry Doubleday (1810–1902), English scientist and horticulturalist
- Sue Doughty (b. 1948), English politician
- Paul Douglas (1892–1976), economist and US senator
- Margaret Drabble (b. 1939), English novelist
- Muriel Duckworth (1908–2009), Canadian peace campaigner
- Cuthbert Dukes (1890–1977), English physician and pathologist
- Robert Dunkin (1761–1831), English businessman and patron of science
- Mary Dyer (c. 1611–1660), colonial American religious martyr

=== E ===
- Solomon Eccles (1618–1683), initially an English composer, later a Quaker preacher
- Arthur Stanley Eddington (1882–1944), UK astrophysicist
- Paul Eddington (1927–1995), English actor
- George Edmondson (1798–1863), English educator
- Fritz Eichenberg (1901–1990), German illustrator
- George Ellis (b. 1939), American Templeton Prize winning cosmologist
- Rowland Ellis (1650–1731), Welsh Quaker leader
- Thomas Ellwood (1639–1713), English religious writer
- Joshua Evans (1731–1798), minister, journalist, and abolitionist from Haddonfield, New Jersey
- Katherine Evans (1618–1692), English evangelist

=== F ===
- Chuck Fager (b. 1942), American civil rights campaigner
- Marjorie Farquharson (1953–2016), Scottish political scientist and human rights worker with Amnesty International
- Jane Fearon (1654 or 1656–1737), Northern English pamphleteer who refuted predestination
- Margaret Fell (1614–1702), "Mother of Quakerism," one of the Valiant Sixty, owner of Swarthmoor Hall, later married to George Fox
- John Fenwick (1618–1683), English founder of Fenwick's Colony, the first English settlement in West Jersey
- James Finlayson (c. 1772 – c. 1852), Scottish engineer prominent in Finland
- Mary Fisher (1623–1698), English Quaker preacher
- Isabella Ford (1855–1924), English feminist and socialist
- Mary Forster (c. 1620–1687), English polemicist
- Edwin B. Forsythe (1916–1984), representative for New Jersey
- Richard J. Foster, American ecumenical leader and reformer, founder of Renovaré
- John Fothergill (1712–1780), English Quaker physician, preacher and philanthropist
- Caroline Fox (1819–1871), English diarist
- George Fox (1624–1691), founder of the Religious Society of Friends (Quakers)
- Robert Were Fox I (1754–1818), English businessman
- Robert Were Fox II (1789–1877), English geologist
- Samuel Fox (1781–1868), English philanthropist and grocer
- Tom Fox (1951–2006), humanitarian worker with Christian Peacemaking teams, held captive and killed in Iraq
- Esther G. Frame (1840–1920), American Quaker minister and evangelist
- Ursula Franklin (1921–2016), German-born Canadian metallurgist and research physicist
- Francis Frith (1822–1898), English photographer
- Christopher Fry (1907–2005), English playwright
- Elizabeth Fry (1780–1845), English prison reformer
- Joan Mary Fry (1862–1955), English relief worker and social reformer
- Joseph Fry (1728-1787), English type-founder and chocolate maker
- Joseph Fry (1777–1861), English tea dealer and an unsuccessful banker
- Margery Fry (1874–1958), English penal reformer and college principal
- Jonathan Fryer (1950–2021), British writer, broadcaster, lecturer and Liberal Democrat politician

=== G ===
- Thomas Garrett (1789–1871), American abolitionist
- Charles Gilpin (1815–1874), member of UK Parliament
- Rickman Godlee (1849–1925), English surgeon and biographer
- George Graham (1673–1751), English clockmaker, inventor, and member of the Royal Society
- Hetty Green (1834–1916), businesswoman and financier known as "the richest woman in America" during the Gilded Age, nicknamed the Witch of Wall Street
- Marion Greeves (1894–1979), one of the first two female members of the Senate of Northern Ireland
- Israel Gregg (1775–1847), first captain of the steamboat Enterprise
- Stephen Grellet (1773–1855), French-born American missionary
- Philip Gross (b. 1952), English poet, novelist and playwright
- Edward Grubb (1854–1939), English religious writer
- Isabel Grubb (1881–1972), Irish historian
- Paul Grundy (living), founding President of Patient-Centered Primary Care Collaborative and IBM's Global Director of Healthcare Transformation
- Joseph John Gurney (1788–1847), English banker, evangelical and abolitionist

=== H ===
- Elizabeth Haddon (1680–1762), English-born founder of Haddonfield, New Jersey
- Denis Halliday (1941–), former Assistant Secretary-General of the United Nations and anti-war activist
- Sheila Hancock (b. 1933), English comedian/actress
- Edmund Happold (1930–1996), English engineer
- Jan de Hartog (1914–2002), Dutch-born American playwright, novelist, and social critic
- David Hartsough (b. 1940), American peace activist
- Laura Smith Haviland (1808–1898), American abolitionist and social reformer
- Alice Hayes (1657–1720), English Quaker preacher and autobiographer
- John Russell Hayes (1866–1945), American Quaker poet and librarian at Swarthmore College
- Wilson A. Head (b. 1914), American/Canadian sociologist and human rights activist
- Phoebe Hesketh (1909–2005), British nature poet and author.
- John Hickenlooper (b. 1952), American politician
- Edward Hicks (1780–1849), American painter and recorded Quaker minister
- Elias Hicks (1748–1830), American Quaker minister, originator of the Hicksite Quaker schism of 1827
- Declan Hill (living), Canadian journalist
- Gordon Hirabayashi (1918–2012), American sociologist who defied World War II internment orders; moved to Canada to teach in 1959 and remained there until his death
- Charles Elmer Hires (1851–1937), early promoter of commercially prepared root beer
- Samuel Hoare Jr (1751–1825), English banker and abolitionist
- Henry Hodgkin (1877–1933), English missionary and pacifist
- John Hodgkin (1766–1845), English grammarian and calligrapher
- John Hodgkin (1800–1875), English barrister and Quaker preacher
- Thomas Hodgkin (1798–1866), English physician, identifier of Hodgkin's lymphoma
- Thomas Hodgkin (1831–1913), English historian
- Gerard Hoffnung (1925–1959), English cartoonist, musician and humorist
- Christopher Holder (c. 1631 – post–1676), English-born American Quaker evangelist
- David P. Holloway (1809–1883), American representative from Indiana
- Rush D. Holt, Jr. (b. 1948), American congressman
- Elizabeth Hooton (1600–1672), pioneer English preacher
- Herbert Hoover (1874–1964), 31st American president from 1929-1933
- Johns Hopkins (1795–1873), American philanthropist
- Caroline Hopwood, Leeds based autographer published 1801
- Samuel Howell (1723–1807), Philadelphia merchant and supporter of American independence
- Francis Howgill, English preacher and writer
- Mary Howitt (1799–1888), English poet, children's writer and translator
- William Howitt (1792–1879), English writer and poet
- Charles Humphreys (1714–1786), Continental Congressman
- John Hunn (1849–1926), governor of Delaware
- Esther Hunt (1751–1820), leader in her Quaker faith on America's frontier
- John Hunt (1712–1778), English-born minister, one of the "Virginia Exiles"
- John Hunt (1740–1824), minister and journalist from Moorestown, New Jersey

=== J ===
- Frances C. Jenkins (1826–1915), American evangelist, Quaker minister, and social reformer
- Rebecca Jones (1739–1818), Quaker minister and educator
- Rufus Jones (1863–1948), American Quaker theologian
- T. Canby Jones (1921–2014), American Quaker peace campaigner, theologian, and academic

=== K ===
- Jessica Kellgren-Fozard (b. 1989), British YouTuber, writer, and activist
- Thomas R. Kelly (1893–1941), American missionary, educator, and spiritual writer
- Malachy Kilbride (living), American peace and social justice campaigner
- Garry Kilworth (b. 1941), English novelist and short story writer
- Haven Kimmel (b. 1965), American novelist and children's writer
- Ben Kingsley (b. 1943), English actor
- Judith Kirton-Darling (b. 1977), British politician
- Anne Knight (1792–1860), English children's writer

=== L ===
- Margarethe Lachmund (1896–1985), German resistance fighter against Nazism
- Joseph Lancaster (1778–1838), public education innovator
- Lydia Lancaster (1683–1761), English-born travelling minister
- Benjamin Lay (1681–1760), Quaker abolitionist
- Thomas Arthur Leonard (1864-1948), English social reformer, and pioneer of outdoor holidays
- John C. Lettsome (1744–1815), English physician and founder of the Medical Society of London
- Raph Levien (living), free software author behind Ghostscript and Advogato
- John Lilburne (1614–1657), Leveller convert to Quakerism
- Richard Lippincott (1615–1683), an early settler of Shrewsbury, New Jersey
- Joseph Jackson Lister (1786–1869), amateur British optician and physicist and father of Joseph Lister
- Kathleen Lonsdale (1903–1971), Irish scientist

=== M ===
- John Macmurray (1891–1976), philosopher
- Rachel MacNair (b. 1958), American sociologist and activist
- Nozizwe Madlala-Routledge (b. 1952), South African health minister
- Elizabeth Magie (1866–1948), inventor of Monopoly
- Ellen Marriage (1865–1946), translator of Balzac
- Milton Mayer (1908–1986), American journalist and writer
- James Michener (1907–1997), American author
- Rosalind Mitchell (b. 1954), Anglo/Scottish politician and writer
- Samuel Moore (c. 1630–1688), early official in New Jersey
- Ethan Mordden (b. 1949), American writer
- Ruth Morris (1933–2001), Canadian advocate of the abolition of prisons
- Samuel Morris (soldier) (1734–1812), participated in the American Revolutionary War despite his upbringing.
- Lucretia Mott (1793–1880), American abolitionist and suffragist
- Lindley Murray (1745–1826), author of Murray's English Reader
- Edward R. Murrow (1908–1965), journalist

=== N ===
- James Nayler (1618–1660), former soldier, then member of the Valiant Sixty
- Edmund Hort New (1871–1931), English artist and illustrator
- Carrie Newcomer (living), American singer-songwriter
- Sir George Newman (1870–1948), British chief medical officer
- Samuel Nicholas (1744–1790), first commandant of the United States Marine Corps
- Sally Nicholls (b. 1983), English children's author
- Richard Nixon (1913-1994), 37th American president from 1969-1974
- Nitobe Inazō (新渡戸稲造, 1862–1933), Japanese diplomat, educator and author
- John Howard Nodal (1831–1909), English journalist and dialectologist
- Philip Noel-Baker, Baron Noel-Baker (1889–1982), diplomat and Nobel Peace Prize laureate
- Humphrey Norton (fl. 1650s), missionary to New England

=== O ===
- Paul Oestreicher (b. 1931), Anglican priest, and peace and human rights activist
- Amelia Opie (1769–1853), English novelist
- Constantine Overton (1626/1627 – c. 1690), Quaker leader in Shrewsbury, Shropshire

=== P ===
- Jason Palmer (b. 1971), American venture capitalist and politician
- Parker Palmer (b. 1939), American writer, teacher, and campaigner
- Palmolive (musician) (b. 1954), Spanish punk-rock musician
- David Parlett (b. 1939), English writer and games inventor
- James Parnell (c. 1636–1656), preacher and writer known as "The Boy Martyr", credited with converting many to the Quakers, including Stephen Crisp
- Evalyn Parry, Canadian performance-maker, theatrical innovator and singer-songwriter
- Alice Paul (1885–1977), American suffragist
- Edward Pease (1767–1858), English railway owner
- Joseph Pease (1799–1872), first Quaker British member of Parliament
- Sir Joseph Whitwell Pease (1824–1903), Liberal politician and businessman
- Joseph Albert Pease, 1st Baron Gainford (1860–1943), Liberal politician and businessman
- Joseph Pease, 2nd Baron Gainford (1889–1971), businessman
- George Pease, 4th Baron Gainford (b. 1926), architect and town planner
- Isaac Penington (1616–1679), early English Quaker
- Gulielma Maria Posthuma (Springett) Penn (1644–1694), first wife of William Penn
- Hannah Callowhill Penn (1671–1726), second wife of William Penn
- William Penn (1644–1718), English-born founder of Pennsylvania
- Herb Pennock (1894–1948), American baseball player
- Jonathan Pim (1806–1885), Irish philanthropist and politician, secretary of the Quaker Relief Fund during the Irish famine and later Liberal MP for Dublin
- Olive Pink (1884–1975), Australian botanical illustrator and campaigner for aboriginal rights
- Robert Pleasants (1723–1801), American abolitionist and educator
- William Pollard (1828–1893), English Quaker writer and minister
- Jacob Post (1774–1855), English religious writer
- Oliver Postgate (1925–2008), English animator, creator of Bagpuss
- Gerald Priestland, BBC broadcaster
- Edmond Privat, Swiss ambassador of Esperanto international language, journalist, historian and university teacher
- Robert Proud (1728–1813), English educator and historian known for research into the Province of Pennsylvania (Pennsylvania Colony)
- Walter Pumphrey (fl. 1678), English-born American farmer and carpenter
- William Pumphrey (1817–1905), pioneer English photographer

=== Q ===
- Daniel Quare (1648/1649–1724), English clockmaker and instrument maker

=== R ===
- Arthur Raistrick (1896–1991), English conscientious objector, geologist, and industrial archaeologist
- Edith Reeves (fl. early 20th c.), American silent film actress
- Richard Reynolds (1735–1816), English ironmaster at Coalbrookdale
- William Reynolds (1758–1803), English ironmaster and scientist
- John Richardson (1667–1753), English Quaker minister and autobiographer
- John Wigham Richardson (1837–1908), English shipbuilder
- Lewis Fry Richardson (1881–1953), English mathematician and geophysicist
- Enid Lucy Robertson AM (1925–2016), Australian systematic botanist and conservationist
- Tom Robinson (b. 1950), English rock musician and disc jockey
- Fred Rowntree (1860–1927), English architect
- Joseph Rowntree (1801–1859), English chocolate maker and educationist
- Thomas Rudyard (c. 1640–1692), English lawyer and Deputy Governor of East Jersey
- Bayard Rustin (1912–1987), American civil rights leader
- Kathleen Rutherford (1896–1975), British physician, philanthropist, humanitarian aid worker and peace campaigner.
- Thomas Rutter (1660–1730), American ironmaster and abolitionist

=== S ===
- Susanna M. Salter (1860–1961), first woman mayor in the United States
- Clive Sansom (1910–1981), English, then Tasmanian poet, playwright and educator
- William Savery (1750–1804), American Quaker preacher, abolitionist and defender of the rights of Native Americans
- Molly Scott Cato (b. 1963), British politician
- Elizabeth Clare Scurfield (b. 1950), English sinologist
- Andrea Seabrook (b. c. 1974), American journalist and broadcaster
- Ian Serraillier (1912–1994), English novelist, poet and children's writer, who joined the Society of Friends in 1939
- Anthony Sharp (1643–1707), Dublin wool merchant
- Isaac Sharp (1681–1735), early New Jersey settler and landowner
- Yurii Sheliazhenko, Ukrainian peace activist
- Philip Sherman (1611–1687), English-born first secretary of state of Rhode Island
- H. T. Silcock (1882–1969), English Quaker missionary
- Jeanmarie Simpson (b. 1959), American theatre artist and peace activist
- Joan Slonczewski (b. 1956), American biologist and science fiction writer
- Joseph Southall (1861–1944), English painter and pacifist
- Lawrence and Cassandra Southwick (c. 1600–1660), English-born colonial American Quakers persecuted with their children for their religious beliefs
- Jane Sowle (c. 1631–1711), English printer and publisher
- Tace Sowle (1666–1749), English printer and publisher
- Helen Steven (1942–2016), Scottish peace activist
- Dorothy Stowe (1920–2010), American-born Canadian social activist and environmentalist, co-founder of Greenpeace
- Emily Stowe (1831–1903), The first female physician to practise in Canada, and an activist for women's rights and suffrage.
- Irving Stowe (1915–1974), American-born social activist and environmentalist, co-founder of Greenpeace
- John Strettell (1721–1786), English merchant
- Robert Strettell (1693–1762), Irish-born American Quaker convert, early mayor of Philadelphia
- Joseph Sturge (1793–1859), British abolitionist
- Thomas Sturge (1787–1866), British businessman, shipowner and philanthropist
- Thomas Sturge the elder (1749–1825), British oil merchant and philanthropist
- Donald Swann (1923–1994), Welsh-born composer, musician and entertainer
- Noah Haynes Swayne (1804–1884), American jurist and politician

=== T ===
- Jonathan Talbot (b. 1939), American artist, author, and educator
- Heather Tanner (1903–1993), English writer and peace campaigner
- Robin Tanner (1904–1988), English artist, etcher and printmaker
- John Tawell Murderer
- Henry S. Taylor, winner of the Pulitzer Prize for poetry in 1986
- Joseph Taylor (b. 1941), American winner of the Nobel Prize in Physics
- Valerie Taylor (1913–1997), American novelist
- Philip E. Thomas (1776–1861), first president of the B&O Railroad (the first railroad in the US)
- Bonnie Tinker (1948–2009), American activist
- Thomas Tompion (1639–1713), English clockmaker
- Peterson Toscano (b. 1965), American actor, playwright and gay activist
- Khalil Totah (1886–1955), Palestinian educator and anti-Zionist activist
- Theophila Townsend (d. 1692), English writer and activist
- Connor Trinneer (b. 1969), actor
- D. Elton Trueblood (1900–1994), theologian
- Benjamin Franklin Trueblood (1847–1916), American pacifist who served the American Peace Society for 23 years
- Daniel Hack Tuke (1827–1895), English physician and expert in mental illness
- Henry Tuke (1755–1814), English co-founder of the York Retreat
- Henry Scott Tuke, RA RWS (1858–1929), English visual artist, painter and photographer notable for Impressionist style
- James Hack Tuke (1819–1896), English businessman and philanthropist in Ireland
- Samuel Tuke (1784–1857), English philanthropist and campaigner for the mentally ill
- William Tuke (1732–1822), English philanthropist and campaigner for the mentally ill
- James Turrell (b. 1943), American artist
- Edward Burnett Tylor (1832–1917), English anthropologist

=== V ===
- Jo Vallentine (b. 1946), peace activist and senator for Western Australia
- William Vickrey (1914–1996), Canadian economist and Nobel Prize winner
- Elfrida Vipont Foulds (1902–1992), English novelist, school principal and Quaker activist

=== W ===
- Terry Waite (b. 1939), English humanitarian and author, Archbishop of Canterbury's special envoy
- Priscilla Wakefield (1751–1832), English educational writer and philanthropist
- Mary Vaux Walcott (1860–1940), American botanical artist
- George Washington Walker (1800–1859), English missionary in Australia
- Ann Warder (1758–1829), American diarist
- Robert Spence Watson (1837–1911), English solicitor, reformer and writer
- Benjamin West (1738–1820), American painter
- Catherine West (b. 1966), UK Member of Parliament
- Jessamyn West (1902–1984), American novelist
- Joseph Wharton (1826–1909), American merchant, industrialist and philanthropist
- Daniel Wheeler (1771–1840), English minister and missionary
- Barclay White (1821–1906), American Superintendent of Indian Affairs
- Dorothy White (c. 1630–1686), English religious pamphleteer
- George Whitehead (1636–1723), English Quaker lobbyist, preacher and writer
- Joan Whitrowe (c. 1631–1707), an English religious writer, visionary and polemicist.
- John Greenleaf Whittier (1807–1892), American poet
- John Richardson Wigham (1829–1906), Scottish-born Irish inventor and lighthouse engineer
- John Wilbur (1774–1856), prominent American Quaker minister and thinker
- Jemima Wilkinson (excommunicated 1776), the Publick Universal Friend
- Waldo Williams (1904–1971), Welsh-language poet and pacifist
- Lillian Willoughby (c. 1916–2009), American peace campaigner
- Emilie Dorothy Hilliard Willson (c. 1838–1899), American-born wife of John Joseph Willson and artist
- Emilie Dorothy Willson (1867–1918), English artist and twin of Margaret Willson
- Hannah Willson (c. 1829–1918), English artist
- John Joseph Willson (c. 1837–1903), English leather manufacturer and artist
- Margaret Willson (1867–1932), English artist and twin sister of Emilie Dorothy Willson
- Mary A. Hilliard Willson (1871–1928), English artist
- Michael Anthony Hilliard Willson (1863–1943), English artist
- Drusilla Wilson (1815–1908), American temperance leader and Quaker pastor
- Anna Wing (1914–2013), English actress
- Gerrard Winstanley (1609–1676), English social and religious reformer
- Caspar Wistar (1696–1752), German-born Pennsylvania glassmaker
- Mary Chawner Woody (1846–1928), American Quaker minister; educator; president, North Carolina Woman's Christian Temperance Union
- John Woolman (1720–1772), American Quaker preacher and campaigner against slavery
- Thomas William Worsdell (1838–1916), English steam locomotive engineer
- Wilson Worsdell (1850–1920), English steam locomotive engineer

=== Y ===
- Stephen Yang (1911–2007), Sichuanese surgeon, medical educator, and peace activist
- William Yardley (1632–1693), early settler of Bucks County, Pennsylvania, for whom Yardley, Pennsylvania is named
- Isabel Yeamans (c. 1637–1704), English Quaker preacher
- Thomas Young (1773–1829), English polymath best known for his physics and Egyptology

=== Z ===
- Jean Zaru (born 1940), Palestinian peace activist

== People with Quaker roots ==
Individuals whose parents were Quakers or who were Quakers themselves at one time in their lives but then converted to another religion, formally or informally distanced themselves from the Society of Friends, or were disowned by their Friends Meeting.

- Piers Anthony (b. 1934), American author, born to Quaker parents but now identifies as an atheist
- Susan B. Anthony (1820–1906), American suffragist, abolitionist, and pioneer of feminism and civil rights
- Herbert W. Armstrong (1892–1986), American founder of the Worldwide Church of God
- Kevin Bacon (b. 1958), American actor of Quaker extraction
- L. S. Bevington (1845–1895), English anarchist poet, essayist and journalist
- Morris Birkbeck (1764–1825), American farmer, writer, and promoter of emigration to Illinois
- Daniel Boone (1735–1820), American frontiersman
- Maria Louisa Bustill (1853–1904), American teacher, mother of Paul Robeson
- Smedley Butler (1881–1940), U.S. Marine and social activist
- Ilka Chase (1900–1978), American actress and novelist
- Benjamin Chew, American chief justice of the Supreme Court of Pennsylvania, became Anglican in the 1750s.
- David Byrne (b.1952), American musician, mother was Quaker
- Ezra Cornell (1807–1874), American founder of Cornell University, expelled for marrying outside the faith
- Warder Cresson (1798–1860), American campaigner and author who converted to Judaism
- Emily Deschanel (b. 1976), American actress and television producer of Quaker extraction
- Zooey Deschanel (b. 1980), American actress and singer/songwriter/musician of Quaker extraction
- John Dickinson (1732–1808), American lawyer and governor of Delaware and Pennsylvania
- Nathan Dunn (1782–1844), American businessman and collector, disowned in 1816 but a follower of Quaker ethics in further life
- Sarah Stickney Ellis (1799–1872), English writer on women's roles, became a Congregationalist.
- Samuel Tertius Galton (1783–1844), English businessman and scientist, convert to Anglicanism
- Jesse Gause (1785–1836), early American leader of Latter Day Saint movement
- Nathanael Greene (1742–1786), American major-general in the Continental Army, member of the Rhode Island General Assembly, third quartermaster general, disowned by the Quakers in 1773
- Maria Hack (1777–1844), English educational writer and contributor to the Isaac Crewdson controversy
- Sarah C. Hall (1832–1926), physician
- Sam Harris (b. 1967), American author of The End of Faith with a possibly lapsed Quaker father
- Jonathan Hazard (1744–1824), American statesman and anti-federalist
- Louisa Gurney Hoare (1784–1836), writer on education, convert to Anglicanism
- Bulmer Hobson (1883–1969), Irish republican militant and politician, resigned membership when he became involved in paramilitarism
- Thomas Hornor (1767–1834), Canadian farmer and politician, expelled for freemasonry and joining a militia
- John Eliot Howard (1807–1883), English chemist and developer of quinine
- Luke Howard (1772–1864), English chemist and meteorologist, involved in the Beaconite Controversy and later associated with the Plymouth Brethren
- Andrew John Hozier-Byrne, aka Hozier (1990–), singer-songwriter and musician
- Alfred Hunt (1817–1888), American industrialist
- Eric Knight (1897–1943), English-born novelist and children's writer, author of Lassie Come-Home (1940)
- Lyndon LaRouche (b. 1922), American disowned in 1941
- David Lean (1908–1991), British film director
- Joseph Lister (1827–1912), English surgeon who promoted the idea of sterile surgery
- E. V. Lucas (1868–1938), English writer
- Dolley Madison (1768–1849), American first lady
- Dave Matthews (b. 1967), South African-born American musician
- Thomas Merton (1915–1968). Though his mother was an American Quaker and he attended some meetings, he was baptized and primarily raised an Anglican.
- Maria Mitchell (1818–1889), an Australian, one of the first women in astronomy, who retained ties to the Quakers but became a Unitarian
- Russ Nelson (b. 1958), American open-source software developer
- Richard Nixon (1913–1994), American President
- Annie Oakley (1860–1926), Exhibition/trick shooter of Quaker extraction
- Thomas Paine (1737–1809), Anglo-American political philosopher and revolutionary; father a Quaker, but he a non-religious deist
- Hilary Douglas Clark Pepler (1878–1951), English convert to Catholicism, who founded The Guild of St Joseph and St Dominic
- Bonnie Raitt (b. 1949), American singer and musician
- Thomas Rickman (1776–1841), English architect and author, and major figure in the Gothic Revival
- Thomas 'Clio' Rickman (1760–1834), English political pamphleteer and friend of Thomas Paine
- Ned Rorem (1923–2022), composer of art songs and of a substantial work for organ, "A Quaker Reader"
- Anna Sewell (1820–1878), English children's writer, converted to Anglicanism about 1838
- Joseph Henry Shorthouse (1834–1903), English novelist, converted to Anglicanism in 1861
- Hannah Whitall Smith (1832–1911), American-born evangelical holiness preacher, suffragist and temperance campaigner
- Robert Pearsall Smith (1827–1898), American-born leading figure in the UK Higher Life movement; later began to entertain notions of spiritual wifery, was criticized, and eventually claimed to be a Buddhist.
- David Starkey (b. 1945), English historian and broadcaster
- Satyananda Stokes (1882–1946), American raised a Quaker as "Samuel Evans Stokes, Jr.", later converting to Hinduism
- Justin Sullivan (b. 1956), English singer-songwriter and lead singer for New Model Army
- Cheryl Tiegs (b. 1947), American model, current religious status uncertain
- Margaret Janson Tuke (1862–1947), Academic, college head, and convert to Anglicanism
- Alfred Waterhouse (1830–1905), English architect, baptised into the Church of England in 1877
- William Weeks (1813–1900), American architect and temporary convert to Mormonism
- Walt Whitman (1819–1892), eminent American poet, born to Hicksite Quaker parents

== See also ==
- Category:Quakers by century
- Valiant Sixty
- Quakers in science
