= Quakers in science =

- William Allen – more known for abolitionism and penal reform; a Fellow of the Royal Society and the Linnean Society of London
- James Backhouse – botanist and missionary; author abbreviation "Backh"
- Wilson Baker – organic chemist
- John Bartram – described as the "father of American botany"; founded Bartram Botanical Gardens in Kingsessing on the bank of the Schuylkill River
- Anna McClean Bidder – marine zoologist and first president of Lucy Cavendish College, Cambridge
- Kenneth E. Boulding – systems theorist and economist
- Russell Brain, 1st Baron Brain – neurologist known for Brain's reflex; became a Quaker in 1931 and gave the Swarthmore Lecture in 1944, "Man, Society and Religion", in which he stressed the importance of a social conscience
- Jocelyn Bell Burnell – discovered the first radio pulsars with her thesis advisor Antony Hewish; raised Quaker in Northern Ireland; volunteered in local and national Quaker activities up to at least the 1970s; her Swarthmore Lecture was titled "Broken for Life"; still an active Quaker
- John Cassin – ornithologist
- Ezra Townsend Cresson – entomologist
- Peter Collinson – botanist with some interest in electricity; his family belonged to the Gracechurch meeting of the Religious Society of Friends
- Edward Drinker Cope – early paleontologist who took part in the Bone Wars and for whom Cope's Rule is named
- John Dalton – taught at a Quaker school, but is best known for work in atomic theory.
- Jeremiah Dixon – surveyor and astronomer known for the Mason–Dixon line
- Henry Doubleday – horticulturist and lace designer
- Arthur Stanley Eddington – astrophysicist known especially for the Eddington experiment and as a populariser of science, active in the Quaker Guild of Teachers, attended meetings regularly; his Swarthmore Lecture was titled "Science and the Unseen World"
- George Ellis – co-authored The Large Scale Structure of Space-Time with University of Cambridge physicist Stephen Hawking; won the 2004 Templeton Prize and got involved with the Quaker Service Fund
- John Fothergill – physician and botanist; Fothergilla (witch alder) is named for him
- Robert Were Fox the Younger – geologist active in the early days of the British Association for the Advancement of Science
- Ursula Franklin – metallurgist and physicist
- George Graham – clockmaker and geophysicist who discovered the diurnal variation of the terrestrial magnetic field
- John Gummere – astronomer
- Richard Harlan – naturalist
- Thomas Hodgkin – lived in the more ultra-orthodox era of Quakerism so wore plain clothes and spoke in a formal manner; Hodgkin's disease is named for him
- Rush D. Holt, Jr. – Congressman; former assistant director of the Princeton Plasma Physics Laboratory; beat Watson; has a patent for a "method for maintaining a correct density gradient in a non-convecting solar pond"
- Luke Howard – meteorologist known for work in cloud types and nomenclature
- George Barker Jeffery – known for Jeffery's equations and translating works on the theory of relativity to English; his Swarthmore Lecture was "Christ, Yesterday and Today"
- Isaac Lea – conchologist born a Quaker
- Graceanna Lewis – ornithologist and social reformer
- Joseph Jackson Lister – known for his role in the development of the optical microscope; his son, Joseph Lister, 1st Baron Lister, was a pioneer in surgical sterile techniques, but left the Quakers and joined the Scottish Episcopal Church
- Kathleen Lonsdale – prominent crystallographer; discovered the planar hexagonal structure of benzene; became a Quaker in 1935, as such, she was a committed pacifist and served time in Holloway prison during World War II because she refused to register for civil defense duties or to pay the resulting fine; her Swarthmore Lecture was titled "Removing the Causes of War"
- Maria Mitchell – astronomer who was raised as a Quaker but later adopted Christian Unitarianism
- Frank Morley – mathematician specializing in algebra and geometry and known for Morley's trisector theorem. Was the son of two Quakers
- Frederick Parker-Rhodes – plant pathologist and linguistics researcher, also active in other fields
- William Philips – founder of the Geological Society of London
- Lewis Fry Richardson – meteorologist; his Quaker beliefs exempted him from military service during World War I
- Frederick Sanger – biochemist, two-time winner of the Nobel Prize in Chemistry; raised Quaker
- Lucy Say – naturalist, nature artist, and first female member of the Academy of Natural Sciences of Philadelphia
- Thomas Say – entomologist, conchologist, and herpetologist
- Joseph Hooton Taylor, Jr. – astrophysicist and winner of the 1993 Nobel Prize in Physics for his discovery with Russell Alan Hulse of a "new type of pulsar, a discovery that has opened up new possibilities for the study of gravitation"
- Silvanus P. Thompson – known for his book Calculus Made Easy; developed an idea of a telegraph submarine cable; his Swarthmore Lecture was titled "The Quest for Truth"
- William Homan Thorpe – President of the British Ornithologists' Union from 1955 to 1960; his Swarthmore Lecture was titled "Quakers and Humanists"
- Daniel Hack Tuke – expert on mental illness; came from a long line of Quakers from York who were interested in mental illness and concerned with those afflicted
- Caspar Wistar – anatomist in colonial America
- Thomas Young – polymath and child prodigy; raised Quaker.

== See also ==
- List of Friends schools
- List of Quakers
- Relationship between religion and science
- Christianity and science
