= Gummere =

Gummere is a surname. Notable people with the surname include:

- Francis Barton Gummere (1855–1919), American folklorist, grandson of John
- John Gummere (1784–1845), American astronomer
- Samuel R. Gummere (1849–1920), American lawyer and diplomat, brother of William
- William Stryker Gummere (1852–1933), American lawyer and judge in New Jersey; early player of college football
