= Sowle =

Sowle is a surname. Notable people with the surname include:

- David Sowles, eponym of David A. Sowles Memorial Award of the American Alpine Club
- Diana Sowle (1930–2018), American actress
- Jane Sowle (c. 1631–1711), English printer and matriarch
- Lisa Sowle Cahill, an American ethicist
- Melvin L. Sowle, eponym of Sowle Nunatak in Antarctica
- Tace Sowle (1666–1749), English printer and publisher
