= Al-Ghussein =

al-Ghussein is a surname. Notable people with the surname include:

- Ihab al-Ghussein (1979–2024), Palestinian politician
- Jaweed al-Ghussein (1930–2008), Palestinian activist
