= Jaweed =

Jaweed is a given name. Notable people with the given name include:

- Jaweed al-Ghussein (1930–2008), Palestinian educationist and philanthropist
- Jaweed Ali (born 1993), Indian cricketer
