= Sa'ed Atshan =

American anthropologist (born 1984)

- سائد عطشان
- Born: 1984 (age 41–42); United States
- Education: Swarthmore College (BA); Harvard University (MPP, MA, PhD)
- Scientific career
- Fields: Medical anthropology, social anthropology
- Workplaces: Brown University; Emory University; Swarthmore College
- Thesis: Prolonged Humanitarianism: The Social Life of Aid in the Palestinian Territories (2013)
- Doctoral advisor: Arthur Kleinman

Sa'ed Atshan (Arabic: سائد عطشان; born 1984) is a Palestinian-American anthropologist and professor at Swarthmore College.

== Early life and education ==
Atshan is Palestinian-American. He was born in the United States and identifies as Quaker. He grew up in the West Bank, where he attended the Ramallah Friends School, as did several generations of his family. He was in high school during the Second Intifada.

In 2002, Atshan moved to the United States to attend Swarthmore College for his undergraduate degree, graduating with a Bachelor of Arts in 2006. He then completed graduate studies in multiple fields at Harvard University, where he earned a Master of Public Policy (M.P.P.) from the Harvard Kennedy School in 2008, a Master of Arts in social anthropology in 2010, and a joint Ph.D. in both anthropology and Middle Eastern studies with a specialization in medical anthropology under psychiatrist Arthur Kleinman in 2013. He completed postdoctoral research as a fellow at Brown University's Watson Institute for International Studies.

== Activism ==
In the late 2000s, Atshan began volunteering with the Ramallah Friends School as a college counselor and mentor for students in their senior year. He was a mentor to Kinnan Abdalhamid and Hisham Awartani.

In 2017, a planned speaking arrangement by Atshan at Friends' Central School, a Quaker school in Wynnewood, Pennsylvania, was cancelled after some parents complained that Atshan supported the BDS movement. However, as of 2018, Atshan has never been an active member of the BDS movement. Two of the school's teachers, who invited Atshan on behalf of the school's Peace and Equality in Palestine club, were suspended. Although the school later re-exetended the speaking invitation, Atshan declined, saying he would not speak at the school until they reinstated the suspended teachers.

In 2018, Atshan's speaking engagement at the Jewish Museum Berlin was cancelled after comments from 2014 surfaced in which he called Israel an apartheid state. Atshan's planned talk was titled "On Being Queer and Palestinian in East Jerusalem", as part of the museum's exhibit on Jerusalem. The talk ultimately took place and was hosted by the Institute for Cultural Inquiry (ICI) Berlin.

== Career ==
Atshan is currently an associate professor of peace and conflict studies and anthropology and the Chair of the Department of Peace and Conflict Studies at Swarthmore College, a historically Quaker private liberal arts college near Philadelphia.

Atshan was hired at Emory University in 2021, and was tenured in January 2022, becoming the first tenured Palestinian professor at the university.

During the 2020–2021 academic year, Atshan was a visiting assistant professor of anthropology and senior research scholar in Middle Eastern Studies at the University of California, Berkeley.

== Recognition ==
In 2020, Atshan was named one of Arab America Foundation's 40 Under 40.

Atshan has also received awards such as The Paul & Daisy Soros Fellowships for New Americans, the Young Global Leader Award from the Council for the United States and Italy, the Kathryn Davis Fellowship for Peace, and he has been inducted into the Martin Luther King Jr Collegium of Scholars at Morehouse College.

== Personal life ==
Atshan is a Quaker and a pacifist; he is also gay.

== Works ==
- Atshan, Sa'ed (2020). Queer Palestine and the Empire of Critique. Stanford University Press. ISBN 978-1-5036-1240-2.
- Atshan, Sa'ed; Galor, Katharina (2020). The Moral Triangle: Germans, Israelis, Palestinians. Duke University Press. ISBN 978-1-4780-0785-2.
  - Atshan, Sa’ed; Galor, Katharina (2021). Israelis, Palästinenser und Deutsche in Berlin (in German). De Gruyter. ISBN 978-3-11-072993-1.
- Atshan, Saʼed; Galor, Katharina; Stuckrad, Kocku von (2021). Israelis, Palästinenser und Deutsche in Berlin: Geschichten einer komplexen Beziehung(1 ed.). Boston: De Gruyter. ISBN 978-3-11-073439-3
- Atshan, Sa'ed; Galor, Katharina, eds. (2022). Reel gender: Palestinian and Israeli cinema. New York: Bloomsbury Academic. ISBN 978-1-5013-9421-8
- Atshan, Sa'ed (2026). In a Land of Aid: Essays on the Palestinian Condition. Stanford University Press. ISBN 978-0-8047-9833-4. ISBN 978-1-5036-4896-8.

== See also ==
- Khalil Totah
- Jean Zaru
