= Ramallah Friends School =

Private school in Ramallah and al-Bireh, West Bank, Palestine

Ramallah Friends School مدرسة الفرندز
- Middle School Building in Upper Campus 2016
- Ramallah and al-Bireh; Palestine

Information
- Type: Private
- Motto: "Nurturing young leaders and inspiring academic excellence"
- Established: 1869
- Founders: Quakers
- Authority: Palestinian Authority
- Chairman: Omar Tesdell
- Principal: Mohammad Habbas
- Head of School: Rania Maayah
- Grades: K-12
- Gender: Co-educational
- Enrollment: 1,569 students
- Language: English
- Nickname: RFS | FBS, FGS
- Yearbook: https://www.rfs.edu.ps/en/page/yearbooks
- Website: Official website

The Ramallah Friends School (Arabic: مدرسة الفرندز) is a private school in West Bank, Palestine with campuses in the twin cities of Ramallah and al-Bireh. The Friends Girls' School was inaugurated in 1869; while the construction of the Friends Boys' School began in 1901 and the school opened in 1918. The Schools were run by American Quakers. Both campuses are now co-educational and divided into Senior and Junior sections; a Meeting House was built in 1910. The Swift Building, located in the upper School and named after Sara Swift of New England, was made the home of the Friends International Center in Ramallah after restoration work was completed. During the First World War, the Boys' School was commandeered by Ottoman troops for use as a hospital during Allenby's assault on Palestine. The school is currently headed by former student and teacher Rania Maayeh who is a member of the Friends United Meeting.

== Background ==
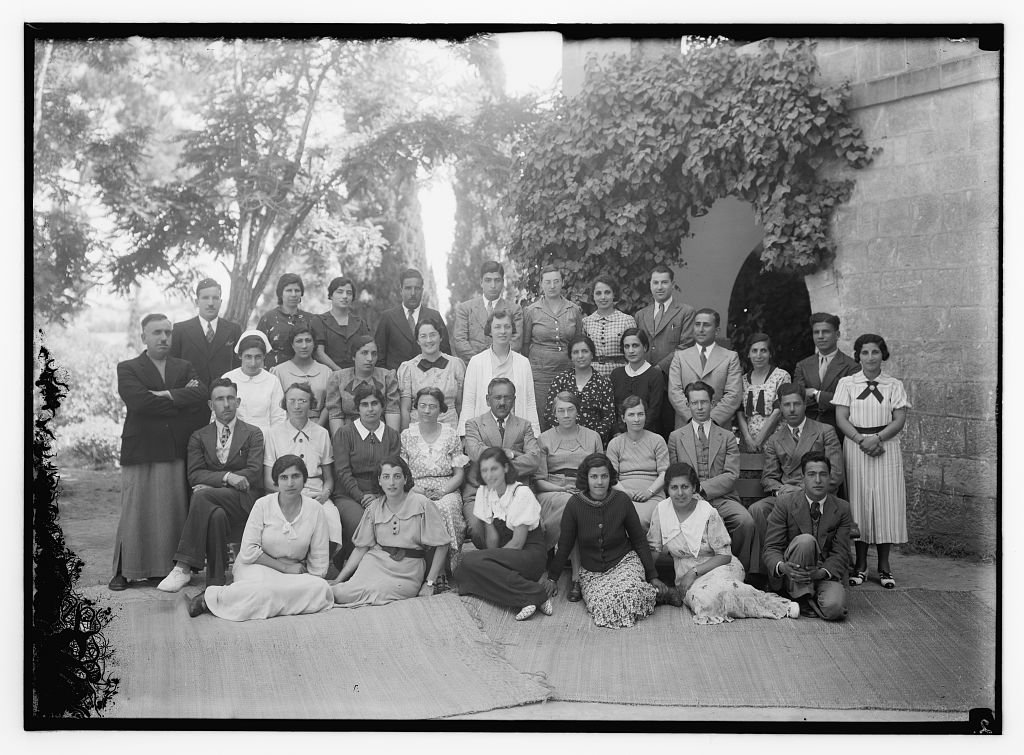
Ramallah Friends School, 1937

The Friends Girls' School was originally opened as “The Girls' Training Home of Ramallah” and was renamed "Friends Girls' School" in 1919. Elihu Grant was the principal between 1901 and 1903. Both the Boys' and Girls' Friends Schools were designed and built by Dahoud Saah of Ramallah. The Lower School serves grades Pre-Kindergarten to fifth grade; the Upper School serves grades six to twelve.

The school was first in the Mutasarrifate of Jerusalem, Ottoman Empire. It later was under the Occupied Enemy Territory Administration, the British Mandate of Palestine, the Jordanian annexation of the West Bank (1948-1967), and the Israeli occupation of the West Bank (1967-1993), before being in the State of Palestine.

== Location ==
The Lower School campus and kindergarten (Formerly Friends Girls' School) is located near the centre of the Old City of Ramallah on Hal Tabqa Sadik Street. The Lower School campus is located at 31°54′13.28″N 35°11′57.54″E The upper School campus (Formerly Friends Boys' School) is located along al Nahdha Street, al-Bireh The Upper School campus is located at 31.9054°N 35.2081°E

== Curriculum ==
The Friends Schools have offered, in both Arabic and English, various educational curricula. As of 2011, they only offer the IB curriculum, optionally IB-no exam for those who wish to take the American SAT examination, but those students will have to apply through the AMIDEAST as it is no longer provided to students. The schools used to offer local governmental examinations: ‘Tawjihi’ until officially marking turning point with its IB curriculum certification in 2001 by the International Baccalaureate organization.

Friends Girls School (lower campus) follows the IB Primary Years Programme whilst its upper campus, Friends Boys School being based of both the Middle Years Programme as well as IB's Diploma Years Programme.

On top of that, Friends School (Upper Campus) hosts the PalMUN conference on a yearly basis, wherein students engage in topics ranging from Local Topics and External Issues across ample lists of committees.

== RFS Along the Years ==
During the first Intifada, the Friends School was closed by the Israeli authorities—as was the case with all schools in Ramallah—during the years of 1988 and 1989, but it was reopened after the intifada.

== Swift House ==
The Friends International Center regularly hosts meetings with other NGOs such as the Israeli Committee Against House Demolitions and the Christian Peacemaker Teams.

== Notable staff ==
- Jean Zaru
- Khalil Totah

== Notable alumni ==
- Issam Abdulhadi, women's rights activist
- Hanan Ashrawi, politician and member of the Palestinian Legislative Council
- Jaweed al-Ghussein, civil engineer and philanthropist
- Amaney Jamal, dean of the Princeton School of public and international affairs
- Rami Kashou, fashion designer and first runner-up on Season 4 of Project Runway
- Widad Kawar, folklorist of Palestinian costume
- Ibrahim Muhawi, professor, folklorist, translator and writer
- Georgette Rizek, philanthropist and activist
- Serene Husseini Shahid, writer and historian of Palestinian arts and culture
- Farouk Shami, CEO of Farouk Systems, Inc., an American hair care products company; 2010 Democratic candidate for Governor of Texas in the United States
- Raja Shehadeh, attorney, author, and activist; founder of the human rights group Al-Haq
- Henriette Siksek, writer and radio personality
- Khaldoun Al Tabari, Jordanian Businessman

== See also ==
- In Fair Palestine: A Story of Romeo and Juliet
- List of schools in the Ottoman Empire
- "Raised in the West Bank, Shot in Vermont," New York Times, Feb. 28, 2024
