= Our Child of Two Worlds =

2022 novel by Stephen Cox

- First edition cover
- Author: Stephen Cox
- Language: English
- Genres: Science fiction
- Publisher: Jo Fletcher Books
- Publication date: 31 March 2022
- Publication place: United Kingdom
- Media type: Hardcover
- Pages: 352
- ISBN: 978-1-78747-162-7
- Preceded by: Our Child of the Stars

Our Child of Two Worlds is a 2022 science fiction novel by English writer Stephen Cox, first published in the United Kingdom in March 2022 by Jo Fletcher Books. It is the second book in his Our Child duology, the first being his debut novel, Our Child of the Stars. In Our Child of Two Worlds, Molly and Gene Myers wait for their alien child's kin to come to Earth for him, dreading the thought of losing him, but wonder if his people may save the world.

== Critical reception ==
In a review of Our Child of Two Worlds at GeekDad, Robin Brooks wrote that once again Cox examines what being a family means, along with all its ups and downs, and he "captures this turmoil perfectly". Brooks added that Cox also highlights the prevalence of bigotry in the world, and the resistance to accepting anyone who is different. Brooks called Our Child of Two Worlds "a wonderful conclusion to a very special duology of novels."

Sam Tyler wrote in SF Book Reviews that Our Child of Two Worlds is "a more uplifting form of dystopian science fiction". He stated that despite threats of an intergalactic war with a race of robots, there is hope for humanity, provided they can turn to "humility and co-operation". Tyler noted that, as with the previous book, Our Child of Two Worlds centres around family, and Cox has a gift for depicting families in a way that "feels genuine".

Author and critic John Clute wrote in The Encyclopedia of Science Fiction, that the "family values" that "triump[ed]" in the first book continue to feature prominently in Our Child of Two Worlds. Suanne Schafer described Our Child of Two Worlds as "a gem of a book". In a review of the novel, she stated that it is "a portrait of humanity with its light and its darkness and explores what it means for humans to be in touch with aliens and upends ... human-centered expectations."
