= In Fair Palestine: A Story of Romeo and Juliet =

2008 film

In Fair Palestine: A story of Romeo and Juliet is a film produced by Palestinian high school students at the Quaker-run Ramallah Friends Schools in the West Bank. A documentary drama, it reprises the story of Romeo and Juliet in the modern-day context of life in a Palestinian city, Ramallah. Work on the project was initiated in January 2006 by Doug Hart, an English teacher of American background . The film premiered on 19 January 2008 at the Ramallah Cultural Palace to an audience of 800 people in the 700 seat cinema. The premiere garnered coverage by mainstream media outlets in the Palestinian territories, Jordan and Syria.

== History ==
Hart proposed the idea to create the movie and gathered together a group of 10th grade students to work on the project. Students did background research on Shakespeare's Romeo and Juliet. During 11th grade, the writers and the director of the movie worked on the script and, in the summer, begin shooting. Shooting ran from 7 June until 28 September. Editing efforts continued through 12th grade until the film was finalized, a few days before its premier on 19 January 2008.

Tarek Knorn, one of the students involved as a co-writer and as an actor, playing the role of Mercutio, explained why the students chose to do an adaptation of Shakespeare's play:

"We thought we would use a play that has values and principles that are shared by people all over the world. Issues that people all over the world have to deal with and learn from such as arranged marriages, love at first sight, teenage life, et cetera. We felt it was a good idea and saw it as our first chance to express ourselves in a manner different from the way the news represents us."

== Synopsis ==
According to the students, the film is designed to humanize Palestinians and show the side of Palestine that does not always make its way into film. The film is made in the form of dramatic scenes interspersed with documentary pieces, so as to convey the lives of Palestinian teenagers. Based on the play by William Shakespeare, the movie deals with the lives of two star-crossed Palestinian lovers as they grapple with the realities of their everyday lives.

In this adaptation of the famous play, Romeo and Juliet meet at a party celebrating the Muslim pilgrimage to Mecca. They are wed in secret by a sheikh. The film follows the basic plotline of the original Romeo and Juliet, though in the film, Romeo does not hear of Juliet's faked death because a messenger sent to bring him the news is stopped at an Israeli checkpoint.
