= Arney's Mount Friends Meetinghouse and Burial Ground =

Historic site in Burlington County, New Jersey, US

- Arney's Mount Friends Meeting House and Burial Ground
- U.S. National Register of Historic Places
- New Jersey Register of Historic Places
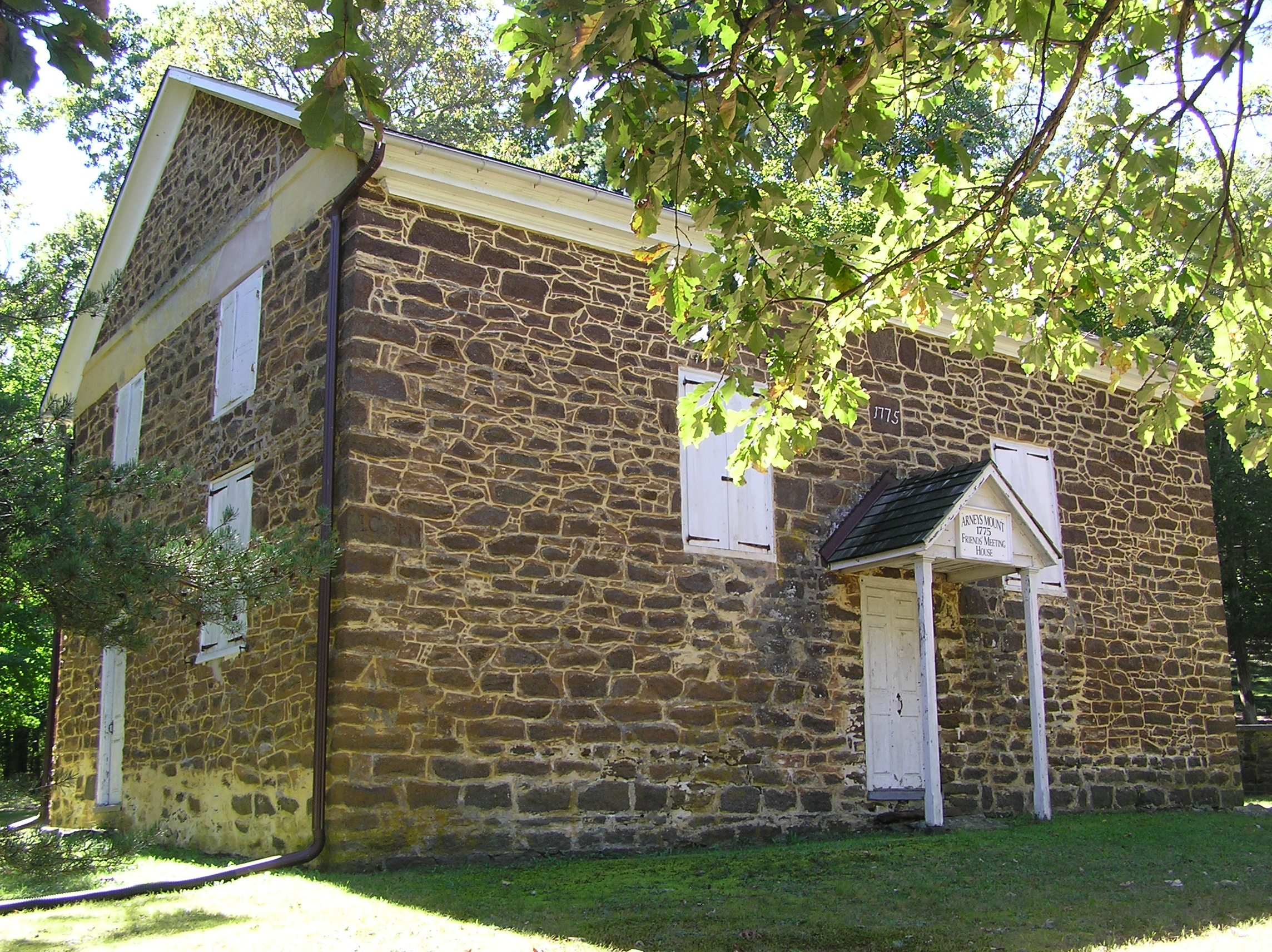
- Arney's Mount Friends Meeting House

- Location within Burlington County, New Jersey
- Location: Arney's Mount, NJ (Springfield Township)
- Coordinates: 40°00′33″N 74°41′50″W
- Built: 1775
- Architect: Samuel Smith
- Architectural style: Vernacular
- NRHP reference No.: 73001083
- NJRHP No.: 871

Significant dates
- Designated: January 18, 1973
- Designated NJRHP: May 12, 1971

Arney's Mount Friends Meetinghouse and Burial Ground is a historic Quaker meeting house located at the intersection of Mount Holly-Juliustown and Pemberton-Arney's Mount Roads in Arney's Mount, Burlington County, New Jersey, United States.

== History ==
In 1743, Friends living near Shreve's Mount (later called Arney's Mount for an early settler, Arney Lippincott) asked the Burlington Monthly Meeting for permission to worship on the first day of each week, during the winter season, at the meeting house near Caleb Shreve's Mount. Some years later a meeting house was erected. The builder was Samuel Smith, whose name appears on the stone above the front doorway. As years passed the area changed and attendance at Arney's Mount Meeting declined. The Preparative Meeting, established in 1776, was laid down in 1871. The meeting house continued to be used at times for worship and Firstday school. Since 1941 meeting for worship usually has been held twice monthly.

== Architecture ==
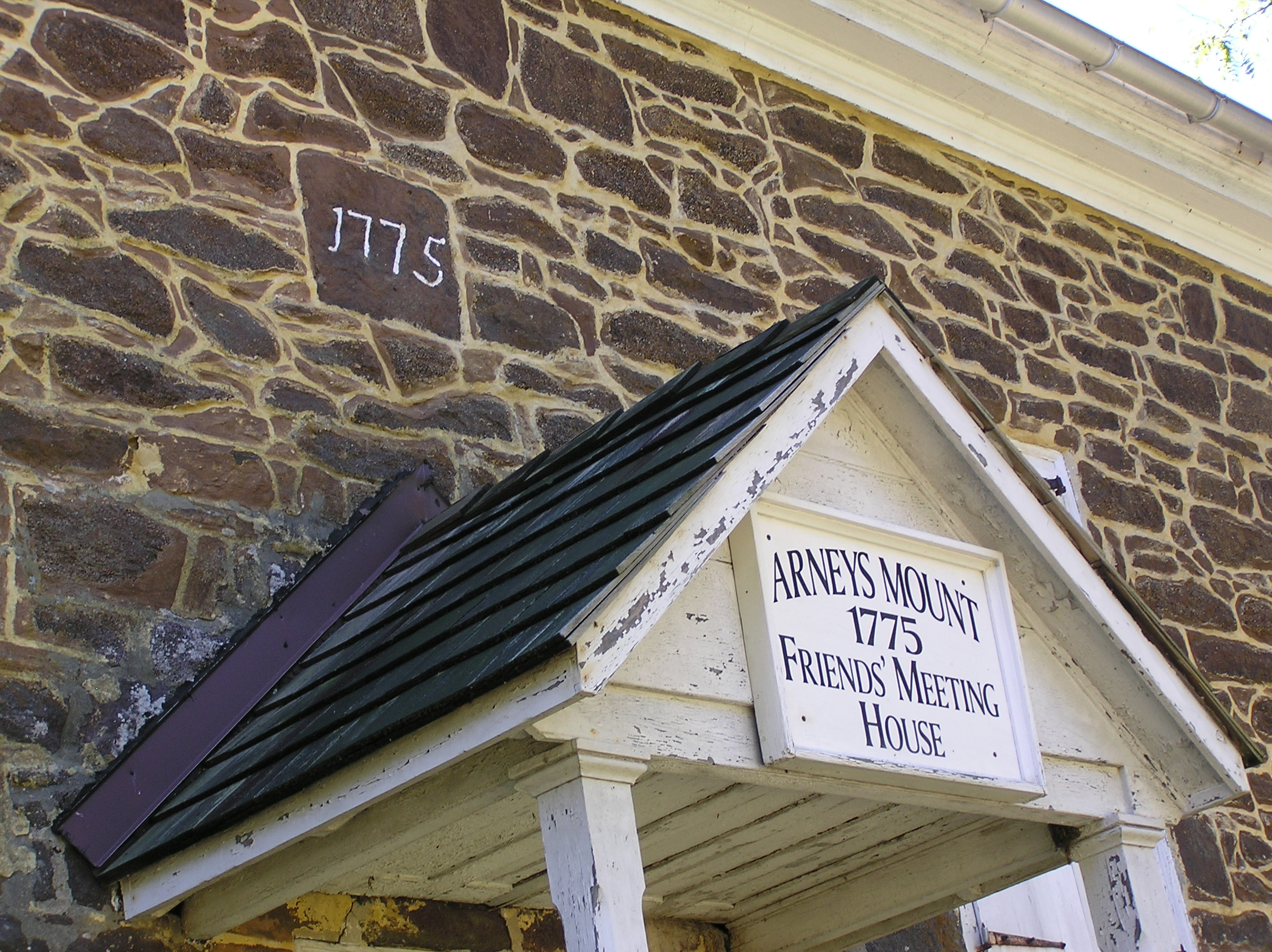
Sign above the front entrance of Arney's Mount Friends Meetinghouse

The building is an unusual example of early stone masonry construction in a Friends Meeting House. Built of local bog iron stone quarried from the mount on which it stands, Arney's Mount is unusual in South Jersey as most meeting houses are constructed of brick. The pillars supporting the gallery are turned from solid wood, the beaches are held together with hand forged bolts and the interior woodwork is in its natural aged hue. The windows are placed in an irregular line to afford the maximum amount of light to the interior, which has an upper gallery on three sides which can be opened or closed by hand-hewn panels which rise into the attic area. No paint has ever been used in the interior, and no electricity, formal heating or plumbing has ever been installed. The original cedar roof is now asphalt shingle. A chunk stove replaces the original "pot-bellied" stove which was stolen several years ago, but it serves to warm the house when winter meetings are held. Horse sheds stood near the south boundary wall, which still holds the iron hitching rings.

According to oral tradition, Samuel Smith was the builder. Inscribed in a stone of the meeting house is "S. Smith." It was not uncommon within mainstream culture for the builder to carve his initials upon the structure. Such practices were generally frowned upon by Quakers. It was viewed as vain, and ran contrary to the communal nature of the design and building process. More common among Friends was the practice of carving initials merely as a form of graffiti on the interior benches, and sometimes on the facades of meeting houses, although rarely are they so prominently placed. Members of the Smith family attended Arney's Mount meeting and acted as trustees for the meeting, and therefore could have played an important role in the construction of the meeting house. On the opposite side of the meeting house is the name "I. Coate." This suggests that Smith was not solely responsible for the construction of the meeting house. Perhaps one's role was largely financial while the other served as builder.

The interior was twice damaged by fire. Oral tradition and various secondary sources provide the only substantive information. According to one source, the fire took place on February 17, 1800, destroying the roof and much of the woodwork. The floor was supposedly saved by the snow, which was thrown in through the doors and windows. The only piece of information found is a scant reference appearing in a book of "Miscellaneous Accounts, 1797-1882." An entry made on December 28, 1801, reads: "paid Thomas Harrison one Dollar for service done at the time the Mount Meeting House was Burnt."

The second fire, in 1809, nearly destroyed the building except for its stone walls. Evidence of the fire can be found in the charred remnants of the former landing, visible beneath the cabinet stairs located in the southeast and southwest corners of the meeting house. The only mention that appears within the preparative minutes are the findings of those requested to "examine the accounts of the committee appointed to rebuild the meeting house." The meeting house is remarkably preserved from its 1811 appearance when portions of the building were reconstructed after the fire. The building was vacant from 1871 until the meeting was revived in 1941.

== Burial grounds ==
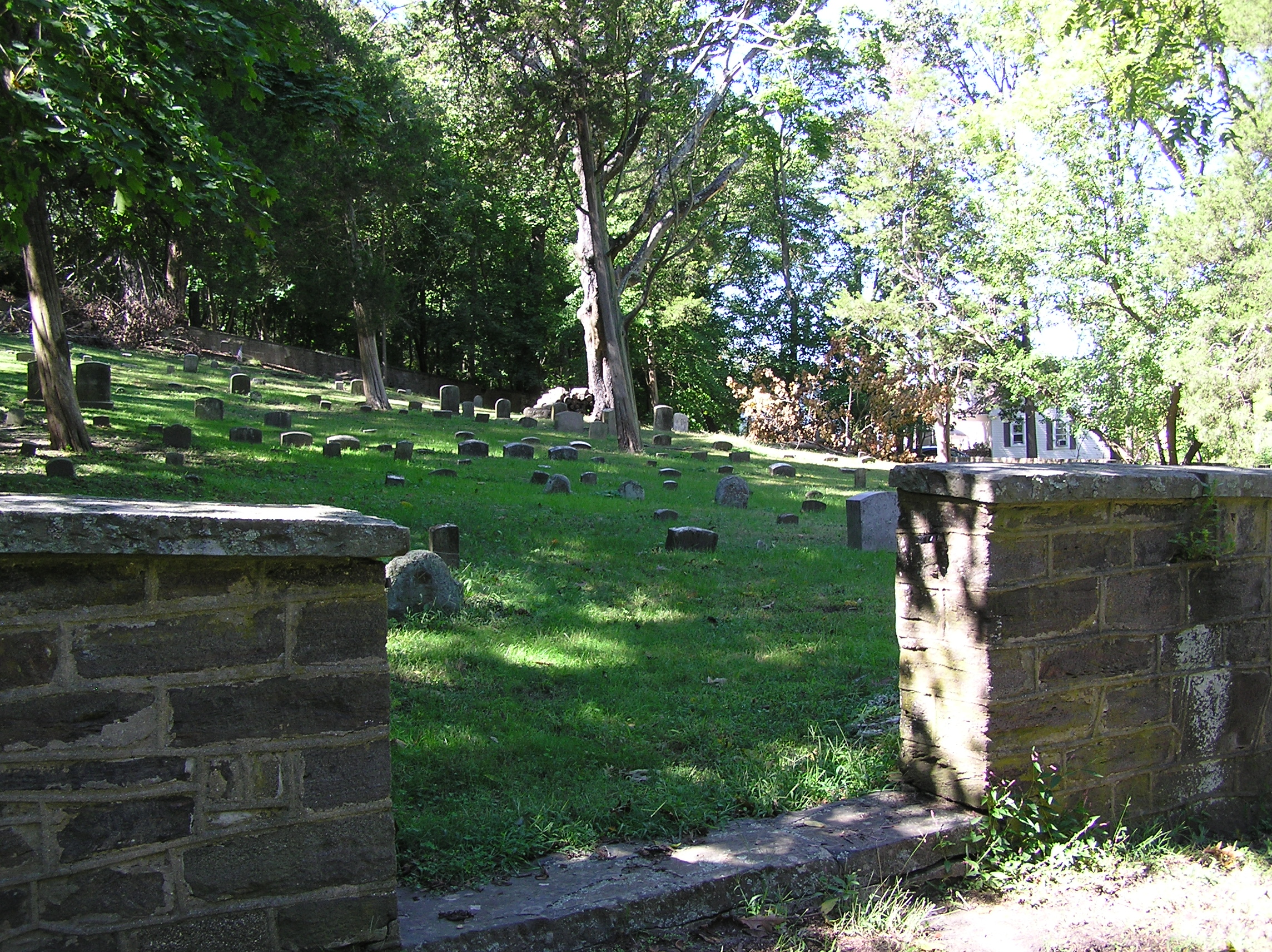
Burial ground at Arney's Mount Friends Meetinghouse

The burial grounds are still in use and pre-date the meeting house by many years. Meeting records indicate settlement in the area before the first petition to Burlington Monthly Meeting to build this existing building in 1743. The stone wall, built in 1860, encloses only a portion of the grave as many persons were literally buried "outside the wall" having lost favor with the Meeting, or were buried elsewhere on the grounds in unmarked sites before the walls were constructed.

According to the custom of Friends, graves in the earliest period were not marked. Records were kept by row. Later, markers were used, and some bear dates earlier than the formal establishment of the Meeting. In 1870, a wall of native sandstone was erected around the graveyard. Names in the graveyard include those of the early settlers in the area such as "Lamb", "Lappencott", "Shreve", "Gaskill" and 'Newbold", and many others important to the heritage of Mount Holly and Pemberton, New Jersey.

It is still in use as a meeting house and the burial ground is still receiving requests for interment.

=== Notable burials ===
- Barclay White, author, cranberry grower, historian and politician
- Alfred Lacey Hough, Civil War Union colonel and Brigadier General
