= Baron Brain =

Barony in the Peerage of the United Kingdom

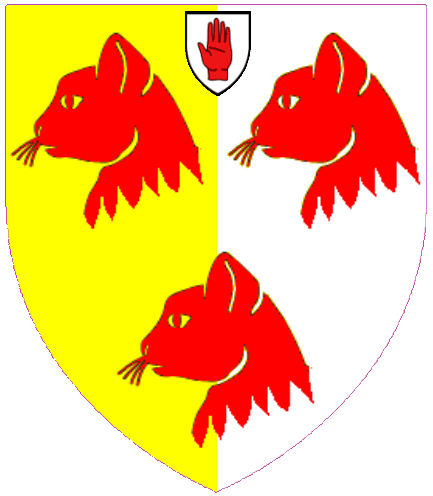
- Crest: A falcon Sable armed and belled Or supporting with the dexter claw a representation of the Silver Staff of Office of the President of the Royal College of Physicians of London Proper.
- Shield: Per pale Or and Argent three cats’ heads erased Gules.
- Motto: Mens Stella Cerebri

Baron Brain, of Eynsham in the County of Oxford, is a title in the Peerage of the United Kingdom. It was created on 26 January 1962 for the physician and neurologist Sir Russell Brain, 1st Baronet. He had already been created a Baronet, of Reading in the County of Berkshire, on 29 June 1954. As of December 2025 the titles are held by his grandson, the fourth Baron, who succeeded in that year following the death of the 3rd Baron, a retired physician and a former professor of medicine at McMaster University, Canada.

== Barons Brain (1962—) ==
- Walter Russell Brain, 1st Baron Brain (1895–1966)
  - Christopher Langdon Brain, 2nd Baron Brain (1926–2014)
  - Michael Cottrell Brain, 3rd Baron Brain (1928–2025)
    - Thomas Russell Brain, 4th Baron Brain (born 1965)

The 3rd Baron Brain died on 6 November 2025, aged 96. He was succeeded by his son, Thomas Brain, 4th Baron Brain. There is no heir to the barony.
