= Our Child of the Stars =

2018 novel by Stephen Cox

- First edition cover
- Author: Stephen Cox
- Language: English
- Genres: Science fiction
- Publisher: Jo Fletcher Books
- Publication date: 1 November 2018
- Publication place: United Kingdom
- Media type: Hardcover
- Pages: 496
- ISBN: 978-1-78648-995-1
- Followed by: Our Child of Two Worlds

Our Child of the Stars is a 2018 science fiction novel by English writer Stephen Cox. It is his debut novel and the first of his two-book Our Child series. It was first published in the United Kingdom in November 2018 by Jo Fletcher Books. The novel is set in the 1960s in the United States, and is about an alien child who arrives at a New England village and is adopted by a human family. The second book in the Our Child duology, Our Child of Two Worlds, was published by Jo Fletcher Books in 2022.

Author and critic John Clute wrote in The Encyclopedia of Science Fiction, that in Our Child of the Stars, "family values triumph" over threats of an interstellar war.

== Background ==
In a May 2016 interview in Apex Magazine (two years before Our Child of the Stars was published) Cox said he was working on a novel originally called A Song for Cory. It began as a short story in October 2013, and was about "bad men" who came to Gene and Molly's house and kidnapped Cory to find out why they were keeping him a secret. Cox explained that as he worked on the story, he released that it was growing into a book, and possibly two books.

In other interviews, Cox said he wanted to write novel that "uses the special mirror of science fiction, and yet could also be enjoyed by people who don’t see themselves as SF readers". He stated that the reason for using the US as the book's setting was because he wanted to pay homage to the "optimistic and wide-eyed U.S.-style of SF". He chose to set the story in the late 1960s because it included important events like the Vietnam War, the moon landing, and the struggle movements for peace and racial equality. Cox said it gave him a platform to express his opinions on "war and peace, truth and lies, [and] gender roles". He added that it was also a period before state surveillance became what it is today, making it easier to hide an alien from the authorities.

Cox was pleased to have his novel compared to E.T., although he admitted to not having watched the entire film. Cox noted that "E.T. is a simple film about childhood, seen always from the child’s viewpoint. Our Child of the Stars is an adult book about the joys and fears of parenthood, and how children help you see the world anew".

== Plot introduction ==
In 1969 a meteorite lands near the fictional town of Amber Grove in New England. The local sheriff is the first to visit the impact site and finds an injured alien mother and her child. He sneaks them into the town's hospital where they are discretely cared for by a few of the staff, including nurse Molly Myres. The mother dies, but the child recovers. Molly names him Cory and becomes very protective of him.

US defence scientists investigating the impact site discover that it was not a meteor that had crashed, but an alien spacecraft. They find out about the recovered aliens, but are told by the sheriff and the hospital that they had died. After observing suspicious behaviour by Molly, Molly and her husband Gene, a childless couple, decide to adopt Cory and smuggle him into their home. But the government authorities close in on the Myres, wanting to seize the alien boy to experiment on, and Molly and Gene are forced to flee across the country with Cory.

== Critical reception ==
In a review in The Los Angeles Times, Ant Jones described Our Child of the Stars as "a wonderfully emotional, heart-warming journey of what it really means to be a parent". British speculative fiction author, Eric Brown wrote in The Guardian that what makes Our Child of the Stars "such a satisfying read" is its "sympathetic characterisation and fine storytelling". Brown said Cox reworks several "science fiction tropes" to create "an optimistic take on the E.T. theme, done without the schmaltz of the film." In a review in the The Financial Times, British speculative fiction writer James Lovegrove called Our Child of the Stars "a pleasing, big-hearted read". Lovegrove said "the pace is slow [and] luxuriating in character development", but added that Cory's "twittery speech patterns" may be "nauseatingly cutesy" for some readers.

Reviewing the book in Strange Horizons, Catherine Baker stated that Gene and Molly's relationship and characterisation are the strongest elements of the story, but felt that the novel's supporting cast are stock characters. Baker described Cory as "more plot device than character". She explained that despite the pressure the alien must have endured, he is largely "meek and passive", and his character barely develops. It is Gene and Molly's decisions that drive the plot, not Cory. Baker opined that Our Child of the Stars will likely appeal to mainstream fiction readers, and that is "a creative achievement of its own."
