= Marjorie Farquharson =

Scottish political scientist and human rights worker

- Born: 11 August 1953; Glasgow
- Died: 13 May 2016 (aged 62); Edinburgh
- Education: St Andrews University
- Occupations: Political Scientist and Human Rights Worker

Marjorie Milne Farquharson (11 August 1953—13 May 2016) was a political scientist and human rights worker.

For over 25 years, she worked on human rights in many contexts, including the United Nations at Geneva and the Council of Europe in Strasbourg. She reported on human trafficking, statelessness, sexual minorities, detention and torture. A fluent Russian speaker, Farquharson covered the Soviet Union from 1978 to 1992. After the breakup of the USSR in December 1991 she dealt with similar issues in Russia, Ukraine and all five Central Asian states.

She also spent a year covering the aftermath of Yugoslavia's disintegration, monitoring human rights violations in Bosnia Herzegovina.

== Early life and education ==
Marjorie Farquharson was born in Glasgow on 11 August 1953, one of Nellie Milne and Alexander Farquharson's three children.

She studied from 1971 to 1976 at St Andrews University in Fife, Scotland, first visiting Moscow as a student in 1975. The following year she was awarded two prizes by the university — the Departmental Prize for Russian and the James Steuart University Prize for Economics — and graduated with a first class MA degree in Soviet Political Sciences.

== Life's Work ==
=== Brezhnev, Andropov, Chernenko: Stagnation in the USSR, 1978-1984 ===
In 1978, Farquharson started working with Amnesty International in London as a researcher on the USSR. She was responsible for building up contacts for information among unofficial and official sources and writing Amnesty International's primary research materials on the region, based on her own assessment of the reliability of the material.

A key source of information about human rights violations in the Soviet Union, by reason of its "scope, detail and accuracy", was A Chronicle of Current Events, an underground bulletin "produced regularly in typewritten samizdat form inside the Soviet Union and circulated on the chain-letter principle" between April 1968 and August 1983. It appeared in English from 1971 onwards, but Amnesty had ceased to publish the translated version of the Chronicle when Farquharson joined the organisation.

Over the next six years, she helped oversee the prompt translation and publication of the Chronicle, and made sure that key "missing issues" from 1976 to 1977, which documented the emergence of the Helsinki Groups, and their treatment by the Soviet authorities, also appeared in English, even if at some delay, in January 1979. As those whose fate was documented in the Chronicle and those who gathered the information it published came under increasing pressure, Farquharson's determination to make a wider circle of people aware of what was happening in the USSR — during détente, after the December 1979 invasion of Afghanistan, following the imposition of martial law in Poland (December 1981) — proved wholly justified.

The last issue of the Chronicle appeared in Moscow in August 1983. When she returned to Moscow in 1991 she met many of the dissidents and rights activists described in the pages of the Chronicle; later still she would write their obituaries for the British and Scottish press.

=== Gorbachev: glasnost and "perestroika", 1985-1992 ===
Farquharson saw the opportunity provided by Gorbachev's perestroika. In a memorandum of July 1989, she first proposed an AI outpost in Moscow and offered to go there herself to set it up. “[I]n two or three years", she warned, "the tides of glasnost may well be turning in the USSR."

She devised Amnesty International's strategy towards the USSR and helped negotiate the organisation's transition towards dialogue with the authorities after 1985, without compromising Amnesty's own position on human rights. In May 1988 there was a meeting in Paris with Fedor Burlatsky, head of the official Public Commission for International Cooperation on Humanitarian Affairs and Human Rights set up by Gorbachev's Politburo. Shevardnadze's Deputy Foreign Minister Anatoly Adamishin came to London in January 1989 and during his stay paid what he called "a symbolic visit" to Amnesty's International Secretariat.

During these numerous preliminary meetings Farquharson secured agreement to the first official publication by Amnesty International in Russian: When the State Kills, a book about capital punishment, appeared in 1989.

In January 1991, Farquharson went to Moscow to set up an Amnesty office, the first time the organisation had a presence anywhere in the Soviet bloc. Within 15 months she managed to acquire, renovate and equip an office in the centre of Moscow and secure the organization's legal status.

She promoted the notion of human rights in the press, radio and TV; she built up a wide range of contacts in Moscow, provincial Russia and the other Soviet republics. During the last five months of that visit, from November 1991 onwards, Farquharson wrote and broadcast a weekly programme about human rights on the national Radio Rossiya and organized Russia's first ever conference on the death penalty. Her campaigning there also exposed the continued political abuse of psychiatry. Halfway through this intense period came the attempted August coup d'état and the Soviet Union itself came to an end four months before Farquharson left Moscow.

=== Bosnia, Moscow again, and the Council of Europe, 1993-2001 ===
From 1993 to 1994, Farquharson worked as a Field Advisor to Tadeusz Mazowiecki, the Special Rapporteur on ex-Yugoslavia for the United Nations Commission on Human Rights. She monitored violations of human rights in Bosnia Herzegovina, during both the Bosnian-Croat and the Bosnian-Serb civil wars. She was responsible for providing speeches and documents monitoring the human rights situation based on research in the field (Sarajevo, Kiseljak, Bihac and Zagreb) and liaising with the inter-governmental community.

Between 1994 and 1996, Farquharson returned to Moscow as European Community & UK Charities Aid Foundation Director of the TACIS NGO Support Unit. This operated within the framework of the European Union's Democracy Programme to develop Civil Society in the former USSR, helping the new Third Sector in Russia get on its feet. The project gave nearly five hundred NGOs practical training — in fundraising; accountancy; project evaluation; media work and coalition building. It also provided original research in Russian on the local and west European non-governmental sectors. The project was graded 'A' by EU evaluators and passed to local ownership in 1996.

From 1996 to 2001, Farquharson was Programme Advisor and Head of Sub-Region for the Council of Europe's Human Rights Directorate, and covered the Russian Federation & Ukraine after their accession to the Council of Europe. The programme helped establish human rights institutions; it analysed local laws to assess their compatibility with European human rights standards; it trained legal officials and NGOs to apply these standards directly; and it launched websites and reference books in local languages.

As a Council of Europe officer Farquharson worked in over thirty of the constituent Regions of the Russian Federation and helped establish a system of regional ombudsmen for human rights. She also gained consultative status for some Russian NGOs at the Council of Europe. Even before Russia became an eligible party to the European Convention on Human Rights, she began organizing training seminars for Russian lawyers, educating them on litigation before the European Court of Human Rights in Strasbourg.

The programme liaised closely with the political organs of the Council of Europe — the Parliamentary Assembly and the Committee of Ministers — and with its judicial arm, the European Court of Human Rights. Local partners ranged from the Presidential Administration to NGOs in remote regions.

=== An independent human rights consultant ===
In 2001, Farquharson returned to her native Scotland and began to work as an independent human rights consultant. A year earlier, in an article entitled "The Freight and the Groove", she recalled and described what had happened to many well-known Soviet dissidents since the break-up of the USSR.

Her job took her all over Russia and to each of the five Central Asian States. She undertook numerous research projects for UNDP, UNHCR and Amnesty International and gave her expert opinion on numerous cases involving asylum seekers in the UK. She was a contributor to Radio Free Europe and Index on Censorship.

Farquharson wrote the obituaries of many prominent Russian dissidents for The Independent (London) — Kronid Lyubarsky, Tatyana Velikanova, Larisa Bogoraz, and Leonard Ternovsky, as well as two obituaries for The Herald (Glasgow): of dissident Valery Abramkin and campaigning journalist Anna Politkovskaya.

A member of the Religious Society of Friends and a Quaker registrar, Farquharson oversaw the first religious same-sex marriage in Scotland.

== Death and legacy ==
Despite the impact of multiple sclerosis, she campaigned for an independent Scotland within Europe on behalf of the Scottish National Party.

In her countries of expertise (the five Central Asian states, Russia, Ukraine, Georgia and the three Baltic states) her style of work and relations with those whose conditions she sought to improve have been described in the following words:

"She advised on the funding and evaluation of various projects, travelling extensively and alone to places with poor living conditions and at considerable personal risk. Her unassuming and modest demeanour coupled with her wide knowledge enabled people to trust her."

Marjorie Farquharson died in Edinburgh on 13 May 2016.

Her Moscow Diary, the record she kept of the months during which she established Amnesty International's Information office in Moscow, was published posthumously in 2018. Farquharson's work at that time combined her acute perception and entertaining style of writing, it brings together insights of the politics of human rights and observations of the wide range of people she then encountered.

Her love of Russia, its language, culture and people accompanied her throughout her life. She liked reading and translating Russian authors, among them stories by Gogol and Bulgakov, and some of the prose of Osip Mandelstam and Khodasevich. She also translated the painfully honest excerpt about the Gulag from Nadezhda Grankina's "Notes by Your Contemporary" in the 1999 anthology Till My Tale is Told.

Farquharson herself wrote short stories. "The Weather Station" won the BBC World Service's best short story prize in 2000 and was broadcast that year by the World Service.

== See also ==
- Amnesty International
- Bosnian War, 1992-1995
- Chronicle of Current Events
- Human rights movement in the Soviet Union
- List of Quakers
