= Rebecca Travers =

English Quaker orator, 1609–1688

- Born: Rebecca Booth; 1609
- Died: 15 June 1688 (aged 78–79); London, England
- Occupation: Quaker preacher
- Known for: Early development of the Religious Society of Friends
- Spouse: William Travers

Rebecca Travers (née Booth; 1609 – 15 June 1688) was a prominent London Quaker in the earliest development period of that religious movement. Her funeral oration was delivered by William Penn.

== Biography ==
Rebecca Travers was born in 1609, the daughter of a Baptist named Booth, and studied the Bible from the age of six. At an early age, she married William Travers, a tobacconist at the Three Feathers, Watling Street, London. In 1654 curiosity led her to hear a dispute between James Nayler and the Baptists. Soon afterwards she met Nayler privately, became a Quaker and his friend. Her stability and discretion contrasted, according to the Dictionary of National Biography, with the extravagances of the handful of Quaker women who contributed to Nayler's fall. Rebecca Travers visited him in prison, and upon his release in September 1659, lodged him for a time at her house.

A fearless and powerful preacher, Travers attended St John the Evangelist's church in the same year and questioned the priest on his doctrine. He hurried away, leaving her to be jostled and abused. John Gough says she was three times in Newgate Prison in 1664, but these imprisonments are not recorded in Besse's Sufferings. She was early taking a prominent part among Quaker women, being especially trusted with the care of the sick, poor, and prisoners. She visited prisons at Ipswich and elsewhere.

In 1671, a year before the representative yearly meeting, the "six weeks' meeting" was established as a court of appeal composed of "ancient Friends" — old in experience and Quaker standing, not age. Rebecca Travers was one of its first members. The "box meeting" for the relief of poor Friends was initiated at her house, where George Fox was a frequent visitor. She is described as the most prolific Quaker after Margaret Fell.

She was the author of ten small works, including a volume of religious verse, and prefaces to two of Nayler's books; also of The Work of God in a Dying Maid, London, 1677 – an account of the conversion to Quakerism and subsequent death of Susannah Whitrowe, a young lady of 15.

Rebecca Travers died on 15 June 1688, aged 79. Her funeral oration was delivered by William Penn. A son, Matthew, and at least one daughter survived her.

== See also ==
- Joan Whitrowe, author of The Work of God and mother of Susannah
