= Henriette Siksek =

Palestinian writer, teacher and broadcaster (1918–2014)

- هنرييت سكسك
- Born: 16 January 1918; Jerusalem, Occupied Enemy Territory Administration
- Died: 15 March 2014 (aged 96); Jerusalem

Henriette Siksek (Arabic: هنرييت سكسك; 16 January 1918 - 15 March 2014), also called Henrietta Seksek, was a Palestinian children's writer, educator, and radio personality.

== Life ==
Henriette Siksek was born to Orthodox Christian parents George and Katherine Siksek in the Old City of Jerusalem in 1918. She attended Al Aswaj School in Jerusalem and the Friends Girls School in Ramallah. She earned a degree in education at the Lebanese English Girls College.

As an educator, she worked at the Alawi School and the Mamounia School in Jerusalem, and later at the American School for Girls in Beirut, Lebanon. From 1955-1957, Siksek spent times in the United States, where she visited Western Michigan College, school libraries across the country, and the California Bureau of Textbooks and Publications to study "the making and effective presentation of books for children". By 1958 she was working with the Libyan Ministry of Education. By 1971, Siksek was writing textbooks for the Jordanian Ministry of Education.

In 1939, she began working at Jerusalem Radio. Ibrahim Tuqan, who also worked at the station, gave her the broadcasting name "Miss Souad". She primarily produced children's programs, including plays, educational content, and music. She also headed a program to teach children how to work in radio. She was present at the station when it was bombed in 1939. Later, Siksek worked for Radio Lebanon and Radio Near East. She was working on Jordanian radio programs by 1957, and later was the "Director of the Children's Hour on the Jordanian radio". Siksek remained involved with Jerusalem Radio until 1967, when it closed. She appeared in the 2011 documentary Here is Jerusalem (Arabic: هنا القدس), about Jerusalem Radio.

Following her mother's death in 1973, Siksek took over leadership of the Four Homes of Mercy, a group of homes for the disabled which her mother had founded.

=== Writing ===
Siksek wrote multiple short stories for children, and was published in magazines such as the International Red Cross magazine, Al-Nashra, Al-Bustan, and Al-Quds. By the mid-1950s, she was "well known in Israel as [an] author and illustrator of children's books".

In 1963, Siksek published The Gallant Five, a novel following the legendary five mares which established the Arabian horse bloodline.

== Personal life and death ==
Siksek married Rurik Farradj. She died in Jerusalem in March 2014. Her funeral was held on 18 March at the Church of Zion for the Greek Orthodox, and she was buried in the Orthodox cemetery on Mount Zion.
