= Arneys Mount, New Jersey =

Populated place in Burlington County, New Jersey, US

- Unincorporated community
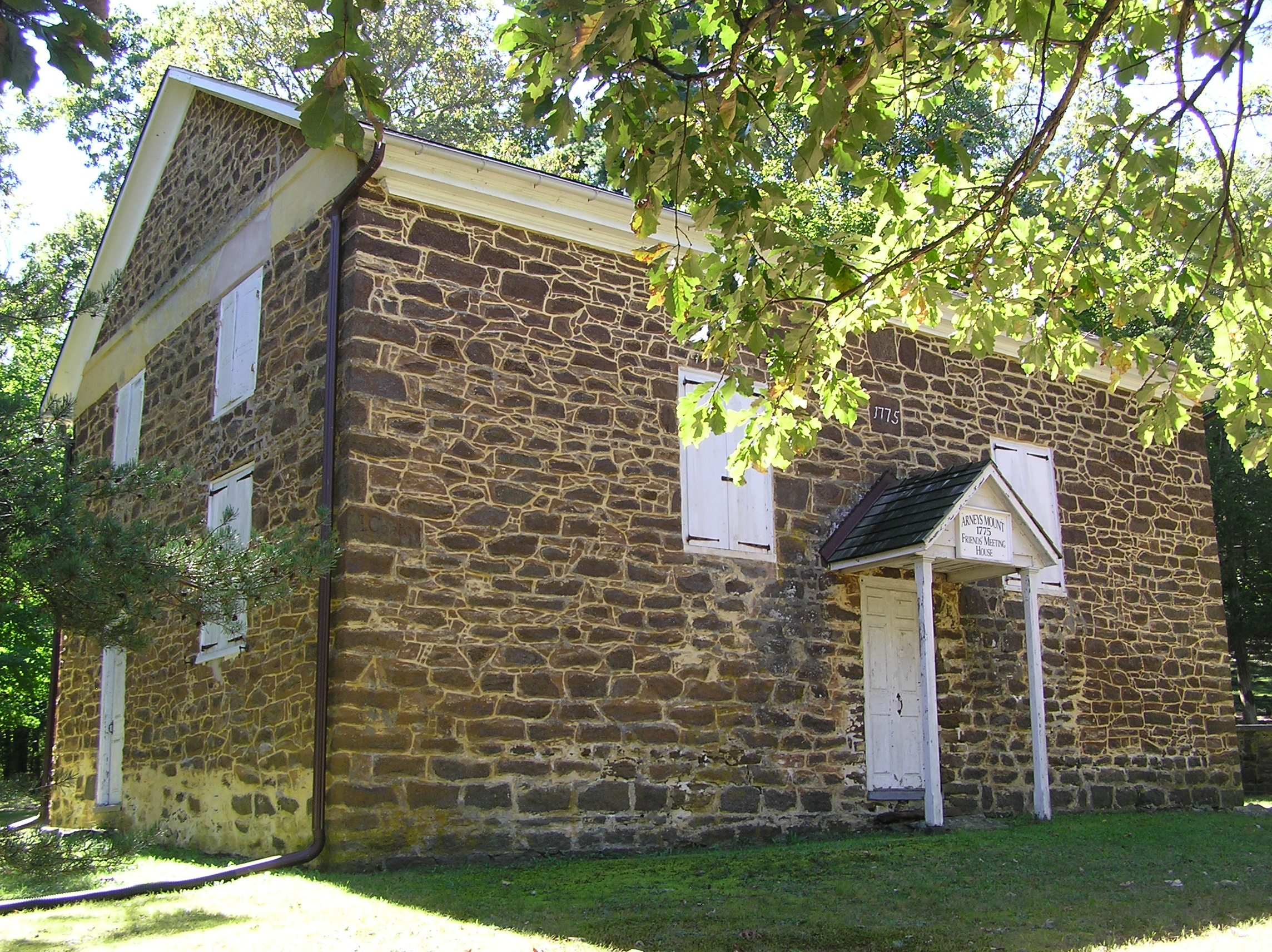
- Arney's Mount Friends Meetinghouse and Burial Ground, listed on the NRHP

- Location in Burlington County Location in New Jersey Location in the United States
- Coordinates: 40°00′35″N 74°41′48″W
- Country: United States
- State: New Jersey
- County: Burlington
- Township: Springfield
- Elevation: 131 ft (40 m)
- Time zone: UTC−05:00 (Eastern (EST))
  - Summer (DST): UTC−04:00 (EDT)
- GNIS feature ID: 874380

Arneys Mount is an unincorporated community located within Springfield Township in Burlington County, in the U.S. state of New Jersey. It shares its name with an adjacent hill, Arneys Mount, the highest point in Burlington County. Arney's Mount Friends Meetinghouse and Burial Ground were added to the National Register of Historic Places in 1973.

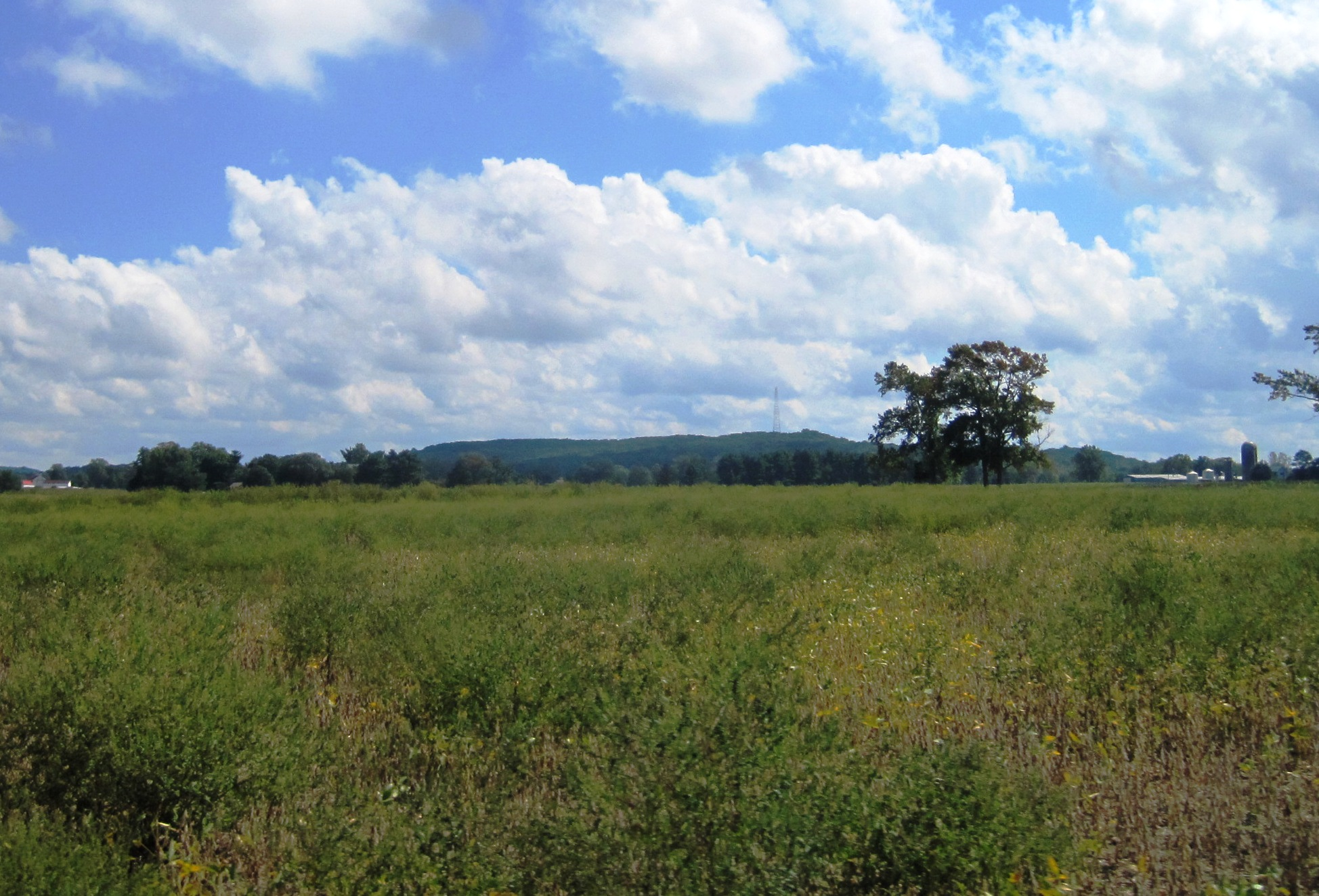
Arneys Mount high point
