= David Cadman (author) =

For the Canadian urban manager, see David Cadman.

David Cadman (born 1941) is a British writer.

== Background ==
Cadman was born and raised in England, near Colchester, during World War II as a birthright Quaker. His parents were Quaker pacifists. He attended the University of London, studying Estate Management in the 1960s. He became a successful commercial property consultant and part-time academic, and in 1981 he established a consultancy firm in Covent Garden, Property Market Analysis, with the economist Dr. Richard Barras. Later, in 1997 he established the sustainability consultancy, Upstream, which he sold to Jones Lang La Salle in 2008.

He has held a number of part-time and visiting positions at universities, including:

- Harmony Professor of Practice, University of Wales Trinity Saint David, 2016-current
- Visiting Professor, University College London and the University of West of England in the 1990s
- Fellow, Wolfson College, Cambridge, with teaching in the Department of Land Economy (1980s)
- Professor of Land Valuation, University of Reading (1980s)
- Visiting Professor, University of Maryland (late 2010s)

He was widowed in 2011 and remarried in 2018. He has two children and five grandchildren, and lives in Aldeburgh in Suffolk, and London.

== Contributions ==
=== Economics and real estate research ===
Cadman coauthored a successful textbook on property development in the 1970s (Cadman and Austin-Crowe, 1978), and several other key texts on risk and management of commercial real estate projects, particularly while working part-time at the University of Reading and University of Cambridge. His textbook is still in print in the late 2010s under different authorship.

Property Market Analysis (PMA) was established to advise commercial investors on property markets. PMA clients included investment banks, pension funds, and commercial developers and it became a successful international operation. It still provides international property market forecasts. Cadman and Barras set up a PMA subscription service, PROMIS, that still provides regularly updated information on most UK and some global urban markets, currently on 300 towns and cities. Cadman stepped away in the 2000s to other consultancy work and to writing and reflecting on questions of spirituality and sustainability.

=== Spirituality ===
On retiring from the world of property consultancy, Cadman became more interested in philosophy and the "place of love" from which Quaker testimonies spring, and how to enact these in everyday life. He has edited several volumes on this theme. His publications include: 'Why Love Matters' co-edited with Scherto Gill and published by Peter Lang (2016); 'Peacefulness' also co-edited with Scherto Gill and published by Spirit of Humanity Press (2017); and 'Love and the Divine Feminine' published by Panacea Press (2020)

He has worked with the Temenos Academy, an educational charity offering education in philosophy and the arts spanning the sacred traditions of East and West. Cadman has also edited three volumes of the Prince's speeches (published in 2014 and 2019). He was chairman of what is now known as The Prince’s Foundation and was a Trustee of The Prince’s School of Traditional Arts.

Among several advisory positions on peace and harmony, Cadman was involved in establishing the inter-faith Spirit of Humanity Forum in 2010, which held its first meeting in Rekyavik in 2012 (as a counter to the World Economic Forum in Davos) and now meets every two years. Its goals are to "bring together leaders and practitioners who hold the view that the positive energy of love is the deepest, most enduring and most valuable characteristic of human nature. The aim of the Forum is to identify and share ways of improving access to this inner strength of being. It showcases practical examples of how love, compassion and a care for others can transform and truly re-humanise an organisation."

Under the pen name of William Blyghton, he has published The Suffolk Trilogy, three novels:'The House by the Marsh' (2017), 'Abraham Soar' (2018) and 'Noah: An Old Fool' (2019) These novels explore aspects of love, loss and living in the later years of life.

== Publications ==
- David Cadman and Leslie Austin-Crowe. 1978. Property development. London: Spon. (second edition 1983, third edition 1991, fourth edition 1995 ISBN 0419202404; continued thereafter under different authorship)
- David Cadman and Alejandrina Catalano. 1983. Property development in the UK: evolution and change. Reading: College of Estate Management, University of Reading.
- Peter Byrne and David Cadman. 1984. Risk, uncertainty and decision making in property development. London: Spon. ISBN 0419119507
- David Cadman and Geoffrey Payne (eds.). 1990. The living city: towards a sustainable future. London: Routledge. ISBN 0415012503
- David Cadman & John Carey (eds.). 2002. A sacred trust: ecology and spiritual vision. London : Temenos Academy & The Prince's Foundation. ISBN 0954031113
- David Cadman and John Carey (eds.). 2006. Sanctuary. London: Temenos Academy. ISBN 0954031172
- David Cadman. 2008. Roots of Sustainability. The Princes Foundation.
- David Cadman. 2009. Holiness in the everyday. London: Quaker Books. ISBN 9781907123047
- David Cadman and Suheil Bushrui (ed.). 2014. Speeches and Articles of His Royal Highness The Prince of Wales 1968-2012. Cardiff: The University of Wales Press.
- David Cadman. 2014. Love matters. London: Zig Publishing. ISBN 0956690033
- David Cadman. 2015. Finding Elsewhere. London: Zig Publishing. ISBN 0956690041
- Scherto R. Gill, David Cadman (eds.). 2016. Why love matters: values in governance. New York: Peter Lang. ISBN 9781433129292
- David Cadman and Scherto Gill (eds.). 2017. Peacefulness: Being Peace and Making Peace. Spirit of Humanity Press. ISBN 9789935936301
- (as William Blyghton). 2017. The House by the Marsh (novel). Write Factor. ISBN 0993385982
- David Cadman. 2017. Peacefulness: being peace and making peace]. Spirit of Humanity Press. ISBN 9789935936301
- David Cadman (ed.). 2019. Speeches and Articles of His Royal Highness The Prince of Wales 2013-2017. Cardiff: The University of Wales Press.
- (as William Blyghton). 2020. Abraham Soar. Panacea Books.
- (as William Blyghton). 2020. Noah: An Old Fool. Panacea Books.
