= Ann Warder =

American diarist

Ann Warder, born Ann Head (1758–1829) was an American diarist. Her journal, kept for her sister, provides an account of Pennsylvania Quaker life.

== Life ==
Ann Head was born into a Quaker family in Ipswich, England in 1758. She was the daughter of John Head and Ann Wheeler. Her father was a grocer. In 1779 she married John Warder (1751–1828), a wealthy Philadelphia-born merchant. After a decade of married life in England, the family moved to North America, settling permanently in Philadelphia in 1788.

The couple had ten children, seven of whom lived to be adults. They included Mary Ann Warder Bacon (1782–1865), Elizabeth Warder Janney (1793–1851), and Caroline Warder Cadbury (1801–1868). Her husband died in 1828, and she died in Philadelphia in 1829.

Extracts from Warder's journal were posthumously published in the Pennsylvania Magazine and Biography. Her papers, including letters and journals, are held by the Historical Society of Pennsylvania. Selections from her work have been anthologized in collections of women's writing or records of the American Revolution, including Second to None: From the sixteenth century to 1865 (University of Nebraska Press 1993).

== Works ==
- 'Extracts from the Diary of Mrs. Ann Warder'. Pennsylvania Magazine and Biography, vol. 17, pp. 444–461 (1893) and vol. 18, pp. 51–63 (1894).
