= Caroline Hopwood =

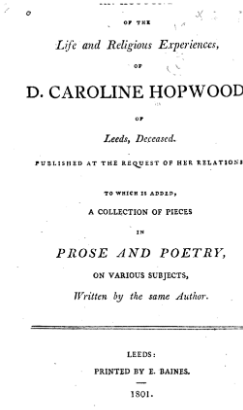
- Born: 1700s
- Died: 1801 or before Leeds

D. Caroline Hopwood born D. Caroline Skene (1700s – 1801 at the latest) was a British autobiographer and schoolmistress of Leeds, England.

== Life ==
Hopwood came from Leeds where her family were Anglicans. Her mother's father was Dr. Law and her mother brought up in Carlisle. Her father was a lieutenant in the army from Scotland. She had an elder sister, whom she felt her mother thought of as her favourite. The times and places of her life are vague as the oblt record of her life comes from her own autobiography. This was not published until 1801 by her family who survived her. Sho wrote particularly about her own religious concerns. For instance she records that at the age of seven she was "convicted of sin" and in the following year her father died and she recorded that she was "afraid to die".

By 1768 she had married and in that year she left the Presbyterians to join the Methodists even though she initially thought them "low mean people" and after further investigation of their "studied serrmons" and questioning their unsatisfying "Methodist principles she decided that their aim was "outward atonement only". She and Mr Hopwood had two daughters and at some point his business failed to keep them. Caroline opened a school to make money where she taught pastry, needlwork and drawing.

Her religious search saw her read John Woolman's treatise "Some Considerations on the Keeping of Negroes" which he had completed in 1762. The treatise was a well argued argument for the abolition of slavery and in the interim the abandonment of sugar and textile dyes that resulted from slavery. He died in nearby York in 1772. The other significant influence of her religious life was the leading Quaker Edmund Gurney from Norfolk. She heard his preach at the request of her eight-year-old child and then went on to join the Society of Friends.

In 1781, she began her life story, which was the same time that she decided to join the Society of Friends despite the disapproval of her Methodist community.

Hopwood died in Leeds and her family arranged for her life story, which she had completed in 1788, to be made into a book that included some of her poems and prose. In 1801, her autobiography was published.
