= Russell Brain, 1st Baron Brain =

British neurologist (1895–1966)

The Right Honourable The Lord Brain
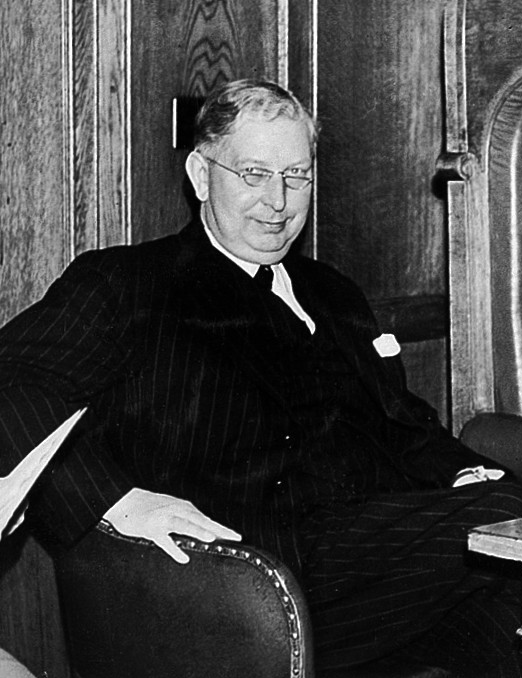
- Brain in 1956
- Born: Walter Russell Brain; 23 October 1895; Reading, England
- Died: 29 December 1966 (aged 71)
- Education: New College, Oxford
- Known for: Brain's reflex
- Awards: Fellow of the Royal Society
- Scientific career
- Workplaces: University of Oxford

Walter Russell Brain, 1st Baron Brain (23 October 1895 – 29 December 1966) was a British neurologist. He was principal author of the standard work on neurology, Brain's Diseases of the Nervous System, and longtime editor of the neurological medical journal titled Brain. He is also eponymised with "Brain's reflex", a reflex exhibited by humans when assuming the quadrupedal position.

== Career ==
Brain was educated at Mill Hill School and New College, Oxford, where he started to study history, but disliked it. The First World War having begun in 1914, the following year he joined the Friends' Ambulance Unit as an alternative to volunteering for combat, and was sent to York, moving later to the King George Hospital in London, attached to the X-ray department. On the introduction of conscription in 1916, his work enabled him to be exempted as a conscientious objector.

After the war he returned to New College, and studied medicine, obtaining his BM BCh in 1922 and a DM in 1925; he specialised in neurology. Apart from his clinical practice, he was a member of a large number of government committees pertaining to physical and mental health, and was involved in the care of Winston Churchill on the latter's deathbed in 1965.

He was elected a fellow of the Royal College of Physicians in 1931 and was president of that college from 1950 to 1956.

He was knighted in 1952, made a baronet on 29 June 1954, and on 26 January 1962, was created Baron Brain, of Eynsham in the County of Oxford. In March 1964, he was elected a fellow of the Royal Society.

In 1964, he gave the presidential address (Science and Behaviour) to the British Association meeting in Southampton. In this address he discussed how humanity was approaching the anthropocene and he reiterated Alfred North Whitehead's warning that "A muddled state of mind is prevalent. The increased plasticity of the environment for mankind, resulting from the advances in scientific technology, is being construed in terms of habits of thought which find their justification in the theory of a fixed environment."

== Family ==
He married Stella Langdon-Down and had two sons, Christopher (1926–2014) and Michael Cottrell Brain (b. 1928) and one daughter, Janet Stella Brain (b. 1931). Janet went on to marry Dr. Leonard Arthur. Christopher Langdon Brain succeeded his father as the 2nd Baron Brain. Upon the 2nd Baron's death in 2014, his brother, Michael, succeeded as 3rd Baron Brain.

== Religious beliefs ==
He became a Quaker in 1931 and gave the Swarthmore Lecture in 1944, 'Man, society and religion', in which he stressed the importance of a social conscience.

== Arms ==
Coat of arms of Russell Brain, 1st Baron Brain
Crest A falcon Sable armed and belled Or supporting with the dexter claw a representation of the Silver Staff of Office of the President of the Royal College of Physicians of London Proper. Escutcheon Per pale Or and Argent three cats' heads erased Gules. Motto Mens Stella Cerebri

== See also ==
- Aptronym
- Nominative determinism

Academic offices
Preceded by The Lord Moran	President of the Royal College of Physicians; 1950–1956	Succeeded by Robert Platt
Peerage of the United Kingdom
New creation	Baron Brain; 1962–1966	Succeeded by Christopher Brain
Baronetage of the United Kingdom
New creation	Baronet (of Reading); 1954–1966	Succeeded by Christopher Brain
