= Margarethe Lachmund =

German resistance fighter against Nazism (1896-1985)

Margarethe Lachmund (born Margarethe Grobbecker 17 September 1896 Woldegk – 14 October 1985 Cologne) was a German resistance fighter against Nazism, and peace activist. As a German Quaker, she expedited aid to Jews in the north of Germany. She opposed the draft in postwar Germany and the use of nuclear weapons. She belonged to the Religious Society of Friends.

== Life ==
Lachmund was a tutor who joined the German National People's Party after the end of World War I. In 1921 she married Hans Lachmund. They were members of the German Peace Society. She attended the 1924 Peace Congress. She worked for the “Church Aid Office for Protestant Non-Aryans” in Pomerania.

She aided displaced Germans. In February 1940, about 1,200 Jews were deported from Western Pomerania to the Lublin district. To help the evacuees, she became a prime organizer of help. Even after the War, beginning in 1948, she worked for the Quakers and operated their West Berlin office.

She clerked the German Friends Annual Meeting.

== Selected works ==
- Lachmund, Margarethe (1976). Margarethe Lachmund zum 80. [achtzigsten] Geburtstag: e. Lebensbild, zsgest. aus ihren eigenen Buchbeitr., Briefen u. Vorträgen zwischen 1935 u. 1973 (in German). Sensen-Verlag.
- Lachmund, Margarethe (1979). With Thine Adversary in the Way: A Quaker Witness for Reconciliation. Pendle Hill Publications. ISBN 978-0-87574-228-1.
- Lachmund, Margarethe (1 January 1961). Christians in a divided world: The attitude of Christians in the tensions between East and West.
