= Yurii Sheliazhenko =

Ukrainian peace activist

Yurii Vadymovych Sheliazhenko (Ukrainian: Юрій Вадимович Шеляженко) is a Ukrainian Quaker legal scholar, conscientious objector, human rights defender, and peace activist who serves as the Executive Secretary of the Ukrainian Pacifist Movement and is a board member of World Beyond War.

== Beliefs ==
He declared himself a conscientious objector in 1998. He noted that it is possible to use non-violent tactics to resist the Russian invasion, such as when Ukrainian civilians on the streets of Kyiv changed street signs to confuse Russian troops but has criticized forced conscription because it is against his pacifist beliefs. He as been featured in many international publications, including American Quaker newspapers and the BBC.

== Persecution ==
His apartment was searched by authorities on 3 August 2023 in search of evidence that supported accusations that he justified Russian aggression, but no evidence was found, and he has explicitly condemned Russian aggression. He was detained again by the Ukrainian government on 19 March 2026, during which he was beaten and pepper-sprayed before eventually being released.
