= Francis Barton Gummere =

American professor and folklore scholar (1855–1919)

Francis Barton Gummere, c. 1910

Francis Barton Gummere (March 6, 1855, Burlington, New Jersey – May 30, 1919, Haverford, Pennsylvania) was a Professor of English, an influential scholar of folklore and ancient languages, and a student of Francis James Child. He was an elected member of both the American Philosophical Society and the American Academy of Arts and Sciences.

== Early life ==
Gummere was a descendant of an old German-American Quaker family; his grandfather John Gummere (1784-1845) was one of the founders of the Haverford School, which became Haverford College, of which Gummere's father Samuel James Gummere (1811-1874) was the first president. Gummere's father became the president of the college in 1862, when Gummere was 7, and Gummere graduated from Haverford at the age of 17. After working for several years, he returned to study and received an A.B. from Harvard University and an A.M. from Haverford in 1875. From 1875 to 1881 he taught at the Moses Brown School in Providence, Rhode Island, where his father had taught some years previously. During these years he took trips to Europe to pursue further studies, ultimately earning a PhD magna cum laude at Freiburg in 1881.

== Later academic career ==
After a year teaching English at Harvard, Gummere spent five years as the headmaster of the Swain Free School in New Bedford, Massachusetts. In 1887 he became an English professor at Haverford, a position he held until his death on May 30, 1919. Gummere served as president of the Modern Language Association in 1905.

== Child ballads ==
Both Francis James Child and his successor George Lyman Kittredge gathered about themselves a group of students to assist in and continue the study of the ballads. While a student at Harvard, Gummere assisted Child in their compilation. He later wrote two books which were based upon this collaboration.

His first was Old English Ballads, which he dedicated to Child as "the teacher who has taught a host of pupils to welcome honest work in whatever degree of excellence, and of the friend who never failed to help and encourage the humblest of his fellows." In the Preface, Gummere acknowledged Child's review of the publisher's proof sheets for his book's Glossary, and acknowledged Kittredge's review of the proof sheets of the Introduction, Glossary, and Notes. Gummere's selection was intended as a representative sampling from the Child ballads. It was in this book that Gummere introduced his concept of the communal composition of ballads as primitive "poetry which once came from the people as a whole, from the compact body as yet undivided by lettered or unlettered taste, and represents the sentiment neither of individuals nor of a class."

In his second book, The Popular Ballad, Gummere described in detail his proposal for ballad evolution, which was based upon changes in structure and form. The classification ranges from the primitive to the epic:

1. ballads which are structured as a series of progressive refrains
  - the simplest structure
2. ballads which are structured as a dominant chorus, but with a simple subordinate narrative
  - the transition between situations is abrupt, which Gummere called "leaping and lingering"
3. longer ballads which are completely narrative
  - what Gummere called "chronicle ballads" (now known as the Border ballads), and the "greenwood ballads" (now known as the Robin Hood ballads)
4. combination of narrative ballads as a "coherent epic poem"
  - Gummere placed a single ballad in this category: A Gest of Robyn Hode (Child 117)

Two other students of Kittredge's expanded Gummere's classification:

- Walter Morris Hart later wrote Ballad and Epic. A Study in the Development of the Narrative Art.
- William Hall Clawson wrote his doctoral thesis on the Robin Hood ballads, which was later published as The Gest of Robin Hood. Prior to the publication of his thesis, Clawson wrote a summary article for The Journal of American Folklore. In this article, Clawson combined the ballad classification work done by Gummere and Hart.

== Beowulf translation ==
Gummere was also a translator; his Beowulf was published in 1910 as part of the Harvard Classics series. In 1991 John Espey wrote of Gummere's Beowulf, "it remains the most successful attempt to render in modern English something similar to the alliterative pattern of the original", in a review of an audiobook version of Gummere's Beowulf by George Guidall. A graphic novel version of Beowulf by Gareth Hinds published in the 2000s uses Gummere's translation.

Grendel reaches Heorot: Beowulf 710–714
Old English verse

Ðá cóm of móre | under misthleoþum
Grendel gongan· | godes yrre bær·
mynte se mánscaða | manna cynnes
sumne besyrwan | in sele þám héan·

Gummere's translation

Then from the moorland, by misty crags,
with God's wrath laden, Grendel came.
The monster was minded of mankind now
sundry to seize in the stately house.

== In memoriam ==
One of Gummere's students was writer Christopher Morley, whose memoriam on Gummere was part of his 1922 essay collection Plum Pudding.

== Family ==
Gummere married Amelia Smith Mott (1859-1937) in 1882; she was a noted scholar of Quaker history. Their son Richard Mott Gummere was a professor of Latin and headmaster of the William Penn Charter School. Their second son Samuel James Gummere had a military career, reaching the rank of major. A third son, Francis Barton Gummere Jr., was an invalid.

== Works ==
- The Anglo-Saxon Metaphor, 1881
- A Handbook of Poetics, 1885
- Germanic Origins: A study in primitive culture, 1892. Republished in 1930 as Founders of England with notes by Francis Peabody Magoun.
- Old English Ballads, 1894
- The Beginnings of Poetry, 1901
- The Popular Ballad, 1907
- Lives of Great English Writers from Chaucer to Browning, 1908 (with Walter S. Hinchman)
- The Oldest English Epic, 1909
- Democracy and Poetry, 1911
