= Joan Whitrowe =

English religious writer, visionary and polemicist

- Born: c. 1631; United Kingdom
- Died: c. 1707; United Kingdom

Joan Whitrowe (c. 1631–1707) was an English religious writer, visionary and polemicist.

== Personal life ==
She was married to Robert Whitrowe, a tailor, and had two children: Susannah (c. 1662–1677) and Jason (c. 1671–1677).

She had blamed the apparently evil ways of her husband for the deaths of her children, seeing their deaths as a message from God to forsake domestic and worldly life for one of a prophet. In 1665, she went to London and Bristol to prophesise, and provided aid to victims of the London plague epidemic of that year.

== The work of God in a dying maid ==
The death of Susannah prompted her to write The work of God in a dying maid, being a short account of the dealings of the Lord with one Susannah Whitrow (1677). The preface of this biography was written by prominent London Quaker Rebecca Travers, who visited by her bedside.

Although not fully accurate, this biography became one of her most widely-read works and detailed Susannah's utterances against corruption, her initial reluctance but subsequent sympathy with Quakerism, and her praise of her mother's spiritual integrity.

Initially a Quaker, she later broke with them, later saying she was not a member of any specific religious sect. She later wrote a number of tracts on public issues.
