= Brain's reflex =

Medical sign

Brain's reflex is the extension of a hemiplegic flexed arm when a quadrupedal posture is assumed by a human subject. It was first described by Russell Brain, a British neurologist.
