= Barclay White =

United States Superintendent of Indian Affairs
- In office 1871–1878

Personal details
- Born: April 4, 1821 Philadelphia, Pennsylvania
- Died: November 23, 1906 (aged 85) Mount Holly Township, New Jersey
- Resting place: Arney's Mount Friends Meetinghouse and Burial Ground, Springfield Township, Burlington County, New Jersey
- Party: Republican
- Spouse(s): Rebecca Merritt Lamb; Beulah Sansom Shreve; Adele Wills
- Children: Howard, b: April 12, 1844; Joseph Josiah, b: January 22, 1846; George Foster, b: Nov. 13, 1847; Barclay, Jr., b: February 20, 1850
- Profession: Cranberry grower

Barclay White (April 4, 1821 – November 23, 1906) was Superintendent of Indian Affairs during the administration of American president Ulysses S. Grant, a published authority on the history of West Jersey and the genealogy of local families, and a pioneering New Jersey cranberry farmer.

Barclay White was born of Quaker parentage at Philadelphia, Pennsylvania to Joseph White (December 28, 1785 – May 25, 1827) and Rebecca Smith, his wife. His father and uncle, Josiah White, were prominent entrepreneurs. He became an orphan at the age of six. White was educated at Westtown School, Westtown Township, Pennsylvania, and Smith's Academy, Wilmington, Delaware.

White lived for many years on his farm at Springfield Township, Burlington County, New Jersey. He was married three times, fathering five sons. The children of Barclay and Rebecca Merritt (Lamb) White were: Howard, born April 12, 1844; Joseph Josiah, born January 22, 1846; George Foster, born November 13, 1847; and Barclay Jr., born February 20, 1850, and with his second wife, Beulah, Daniel Smith White born 1853. Joseph J. White's daughter, Elizabeth Coleman White, pioneered the development and commercialization of the cultivated blueberry.

Barclay White died at Mount Holly Township, New Jersey and was interred at Arney's Mount Friends Meetinghouse and Burial Ground, Springfield Township.

== Bibliography ==
- White, Joseph J. (1870). Cranberry culture. New York: Orange Judd & Co.
