= Elizabeth Clare Scurfield =

Elizabeth Scurfield (born 1950) is a British sinologist.

== Biography ==
Elizabeth Scurfield was born in 1950 in Don Valley, England, the youngest of four children to Ralph Scurfield and Ella Jessie Barnes Scurfield (née Barnes). She graduated with a degree in Chinese (First Class Honours) from the School of Oriental and African Studies (SOAS) in London.

Scurfield co-founded the Chinese Department at the University of Westminster in London, where she was also Evening Programme Director, Principal Lecturer in Chinese, and Chair of the Department of Modern Languages. She is a member of the British Association for Chinese Studies, and was appointed specialist assessor with Higher Education Funding Council for England (HEFCE) for the period October 1996–September 1998.

Scurfield joined the Religious Society of Friends (Quakers) in 1995 and from 2002 onwards worked as representative at the Quaker Council for European Affairs in Brussels.

== Research interests ==
- Language characteristics and the search for Chinese culture in the Root-seeker literature of the Eighties.
- Possible techniques in the teaching of the Chinese language to non-native speakers of mixed ability.

== Major works ==
Selected publications:

- Chinese: eleven editions published between 1991 and 2003 (Published in English and Chinese).
- Beginner's Chinese Script: three editions published between 1999 and 2003.
- Beginner's Chinese: An Easy Introduction: seven editions published between 1996 and 2002.
- Teach Yourself Chinese (Audio Recording): three editions published between 1992 and 2004.
- Beginner's Chinese: eight editions published between 1996 and 2003.
- Teach Yourself Beginner's Chinese (Audio Recording): nine editions published between 1996 and 2004.
- Teach Yourself Beginner's Chinese Script: two editions published in 2004 (Published in English and Vietnamese)
- Teach Yourself Chinese (Audio Recording): three editions published between 2004 and 2004 (Published in English and Chinese)
- Mandarin Chinese Conversation (Audio Recording): one edition published in 2005.
- Mandarin Chinese: two editions published in 1991 (Published in Chinese and English)
- Mandarin Chinese Conversation (Audio Recording): two editions published in 2005 (Published in 2005)
- Teach Yourself Beginner's Chinese = Belajar Mandiri Bahasa Mandarin Untuk Pemula: one edition published in 2002 (Published in Chinese)
- Bahasa Mandarin Untuk Pemula: one edition published in 2000 (Published in Indonesian)
