= Stephen Cox (British writer) =

British writer

- Born: Stephen Peter Cox; United States
- Occupation: Writer
- Writing career
- Period: 2012–present
- Genres: Science fiction; fantasy; mystery fiction
- Website: stephencox.co.uk

Stephen Cox is a United States-born English speculative and mystery fiction writer. In addition to his writing, he is a communications professional, and identifies himself as a Quaker and bisexual.

== Biography ==
Cox was born in the United States to British parents who were studying at Harvard University at the time. At the age of two, Cox's parents returned to the United Kingdom where he grew up in Bristol, South West England. He later relocated to London.

Cox said he began writing novels in 2012. He has since published two science fiction novels with Jo Fletcher Books, the Our Child duology of Our Child of the Stars (2018) and Our Child of Two Worlds (2021), and self-published two mystery novels, the duology of The Crooked Medium’s Guide to Murder (2025) and The Crooked Medium’s Guide to Terror (2026).

Cox stated, "Usually, my work has some speculative or fantastical elements, but I am not interested in strict barriers between genres." In an interview in Apex Magazine Cox said that many of his characters are QUILTBAG. on the "heroine-to-villainess spectrum; people need good role models but let’s not pretend everyone is a saint either."

== Bibliography ==
=== Novels ===
- Our Child of the Stars (Jo Fletcher Books, 2018)
- Our Child of Two Worlds (Jo Fletcher Books, 2022)
- The Crooked Medium’s Guide to Murder (Kindle, 2025)
- The Crooked Medium’s Guide to Terror (Kindle, 2026)

=== Short fiction ===
- "The Lamb Chops " (Lightspeed, June 2015)
- "1957" (Apex Magazine, May 2016)
