= Jean Zaru =

Palestinian Quaker peace activist and writer

- جين زارو
- Born: Jean Mikhail; 1940 (age 85–86); Ramallah, Mandatory Palestine

Jean Zaru (Arabic: جين زارو; born 1940) is a Palestinian Quaker peace activist and writer who advocates for the use of non-violence to solve the Israel-Palestine conflict.

== Personal life ==
Jean Mikhail was born in Ramallah in 1940. Her grandfathers, both of whom were Orthodox Christians, also came from Ramallah. However, her parents' generation became involved in different Christian traditions (Roman Catholic, Quaker, Anglican, and Baptist), resulting in an "ecumenical" family.

While her immediate family was not displaced in the 1948 Nakba because they lived in Ramallah, her family hosted refugees who had lost their homes. Her maternal grandmother's family was expelled from Lydda; her brother-in-law was deported to Jordan in 1968. Jean had three sisters and one brother; her brother, Hanna, went missing in Lebanon in 1976, during the Lebanese Civil War.

Jean attended the Ramallah Friends School as a child. While her brother and older sister attended college in the United States, and Jean was acepted to Bryn Mawr, she decided not to attend due to the financial burden on her family. After graduating from the Friends School, she married her former chemistry teacher, Fuad Zaru (d. 1987). He later became principal of the school, and Jean became a teacher of fourth and fifth grade students. They had three children: two sons and a daughter.

She began teaching at the Quaker school after being inspired by her son who broke his toy guns with rocks after noticing how real guns hurt people in the intifada. She led the development of curriculum on religion and ethics used by the Friends School, which she used to teach religion and ethics, and later he daughter became a teacher there too.

== Activism and Quaker work ==
From 1975 to 1983 she was on the Central Committee of the World Council of Churches. At that same organization, she was a member of the Working Group on Interfaith Dialogue from 1981 to 1991. She was vice president of the YWCA from 1983 to 1991.

She began volunteering as Clerk of Ramallah Friends Meeting in 1987. In 2010, she gave the opening address at the celebration of the hundreth anniversary of the establishment of the Quaker Meeting House in Ramallah.

She helped establish Sabeel Ecumenical Liberation Theology Center, an organization dedicated to supporting Palestinian Christians, and serves as the vice-chair of its board.

A collection of her writings was published in 2008, titled Occupied with Nonviolence: A Palestinian Woman Speaks. She has given speeches about the experience of living in the West Bank, where it is incredibly difficult to travel to religious meetings due to walls, checkpoints, and curfews. Among the places she has given speeches at includes the US Institute for Peace.

=== Ideaology and political positions ===
While Zaru is very critical of the Israeli occupation, is a pacifist and believes that exclusively non-violent resistance is the way to achieve liberation; she expressed disagreement with Latin American liberation theologians who endorsed armed resistance against colonialism. She has cited the gospel as her source of inspiration for non-violent action. She has also advocated for increasing the number of women in leadership roles in the Palestinian Christian community. She maintains that extremists who claim the entire West Bank belongs to Israelis are misreading scripture.

=== Recognition ===
She was awarded the Anna Lindh Prize in 2010.

== See also ==
- Palestinian Christians
- Ramallah Friends School
- Khalil Totah
- Sa'ed Atshan
