= Jane Sowle =

English printer and matriarch (c.1631–1711)

- Born: unknown c.1631
- Died: 18 June 1711; Clapton
- Occupation: printer
- Known for: printing for the Quakers
- Spouse: Andrew Sowle
- Children: ten (three survived)

Jane Sowle (c.1631 – 18 June 1711) was an English printer and matriarch. She married Andrew Sowle and he managed the printing business until 1691 when their daughter Tace Sowle leads the business. However Jane is again in charge and "J.Sowle" appears on imprints even after her death in 1711.

== Life ==
Sowles place of birth, name at birth and parentage are unknown. By 1655 she was married to Andrew Sowle and they were Quakers who ran a printing business in Shoreditch. By 1672 they were printing work for the Quakers although they were not taking credit on their work. At the time it laid themselves open to prosecution so they did not begin labelling their work until 1680. At that time they were printing in two locations and by 1687 they had three. In 1678 the business came to the notice of the authorities and her husband was charged with running an illegal printing press. The press had been discovered in a room which could only be reached via trapdoors in April 1678. In December the case went to trial and a jury found him not guilty.

Her husband managed the printing business until 1691 when their daughter Tace Sowle leads the business. Ahe took over at his retirement and continued to be a leading publisher to the Quakers. Her husband died on Boxing Day 1695. However Jane is still in charge after Tace Sowle marrys in 1706 and "J.Sowle" appears on imprints. Jane died in 1711 in Clapton and she was buried in Bunhill Fields. Tace now named Tace Raylton continued the business labelling imprints with "assigns of J. Sowle" until 1735.
