= Jaweed al-Ghussein =

Palestinian activist (1930–2008)

- جويد الغصين
- Born: July 18, 1930
- Died: 1 July 2008 (aged 77)
- Occupation(s): Educationist and philanthropist

Jaweed al-Ghussein (Arabic: جويد الغصين; 18 July 1930 – 1 July 2008) was a Palestinian educationist and philanthropist.

== Early years ==
Born in Gaza in 1930, into one of the most prominent Palestinian noble families. A refugee in 1948 he went to Cairo Egypt with his family where he attended the American University in Cairo (AUC). Graduating in Economics he was elected President of the Students Union. A Contemporary of Yasser Arafat, they presented a petition signed in their blood to the first President of Egypt Muhammad Naguib demanding the rights of Palestinian students.

== Education ==
- Friends School, Ramallah
- American University in Cairo

== Work ==
Al-Ghussein began his career in the Kuwait civil service in the 1950s before commencing his business career which began when he represented Parsons. In the early 1960s he was invited to the Trucial State of Abu Dhabi by the late ruler Sheik Zayed Al-Nahyan to search for water. Al Ghussein went on to establish one of the leading Construction and engineering groups in the Gulf, the Cordoba Construction Group.

He led the company for three decades as Chairman. Cordoba was one of the earliest pioneers in Abu Dhabi, responsible for the first water pipeline from the oasis Al-Ain to Abu Dhabi and subsequently fourteen years later another pipeline from Abu Dhabi to Al-Ain. The Cordoba Group and its subsidiaries went on to construct housing developments, the first English School, roads, water and sewage pipelines, hospitals and military bases. Cordoba went on to build some of the most important landmarks in the country including the iconic Sheik Zayed Cultural Center. Leaders in Micro tunneling Al-Ghussein sought to bring advanced and innovative techniques to the developing oil rich state.

== Vision and Contribution ==
The Cordoba Group was ahead of its time and unique in that it provided training programmes for Palestinian engineers as well as internship programmes and employment. Al-Ghussein created specific funding programmes for the education of Palestinian refugees, enabling them to continue with higher education, and some have become leaders in the field of banking, engineering, medicine and academia.

== The Next Century Foundation ==
In the early 1980s Al-Ghussein founded with the late Claud Morris the British NGO, the Next Century Foundation to work for peace and understanding between Palestinians and Israelis. The foundation has gone from strength to strength widening its expertise to include conflict in the Middle East and Africa.

== Chairman of the Palestine National Fund ==
Having made his fortune in Construction Al-Ghussein was in 1984 elected in Amman, Jordan by the Palestine National Council (PNC) as Chairman of the Palestine National Fund (PNF). At the same he was also elected as an Independent to sit on the Executive Committee of the Palestine Liberation Organization (PLO). He immediately began an extensive programme of reform, introducing accountable methods of collecting and disbursements of funds including cessation of putting investments in individual names. A visionary referred to in the Arab press as the Nelson Mandela of the Middle East, his reforms created a schism with Arafat who wanted to maintain control over the funds collected. A close friend of Arafat Al-Ghussein was instrumental in healing the wounds with the Late King Hussein of Jordan after Black September in the 1970s when Arafat attempted a stronghold over Amman Jordan.

Al-Ghussein was also a key figure in resolving disputes between the warring Palestinian factions in particular Arafats dispute with George Habash, leader and founder of the Popular Front for the Liberation of Palestine; based in Syria. He played a quiet role in the background resolving many disputes between the Palestinians and Arab nations.

Al Ghussein fell out with Arafat over Iraq's occupation of Kuwait and was the only cabinet member of the PLO to condemn the invasion and occupation of Kuwait. His resignation was refused by Arafat. Invited to the White House to attend the signing of the Oslo Accords.

Tendering his resignation after Arafat failed to implement accountable structures and foundations in the emerging Palestinian state he called for the 'Rule of law', 'Accountability' and 'Transparency'.

He was abducted twice by Arafat; first from Abu Dhabi after Mahmoud Abbas (Abu Mazen) made a request to Sheik Seif, Minister of interior; second from the Red Crescent Hospital in Cairo by Egyptian security under vice president of Egypt; Omar Suileman. He was held in Gaza for 16 months. The United Nations Commission on Human Rights investigated and its Working Group on Arbitrary Detention placed his case in their highest category reserved for the most grievous deprivation of liberty. The UN formally determined that Al-Ghussein was 'held manifestly with no legal justification' and urged the Palestinian Authority (PA) to remedy the situation immediately. Arafat had previously maintained he wanted the repayment of an alleged loan. However, despite a smear campaign, both the UAE Supreme Court and the Palestinian Commission on Citizens rights vindicated Al-Ghussein and found the allegations baseless and without foundation.

== Awards ==
Outstanding Achievement and contribution of an Alumni AUC Freedom of the City Nashville USA
