= Khalil Totah =

Palestinian-American teacher and activist

- خليل طوطح
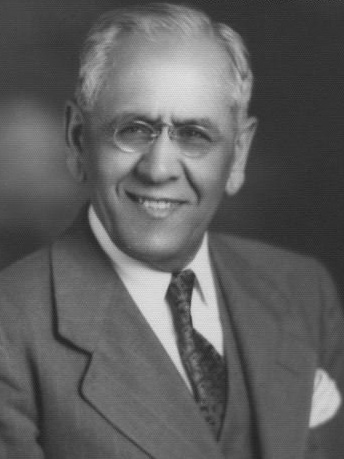
- Born: May 20, 1886; Ramallah, Mandatory Palestine
- Died: February 24, 1955 (aged 68); Whittier, California, United States

Khalil Totah (Arabic: خليل طوطح; May 20, 1886 – February 24, 1955) was a Palestinian-American Quaker teacher and activist. He was known for his efforts in promoting education while he lived in the British Mandate of Palestine. After moving to the United States, he gave speeches opposing the establishment of Israel.

== Early life and education ==
He was born on 20 May 1886 to an Arab Quaker family in Ramallah; his parents were raised in the Greek Orthodox Church but converted to Quakerism. Originally his parents homeschooled him, but he later attended the Friends School in Al-Bireh, and then another Friends School in Lebanon. He proceeded to attend an English School in Jerusalem from 1903 to 1905, after which he moved to the United States to study at the Friends Oak Grove Seminary in Vassalboro, Maine. From 1908 to 1911 he attended Clark College in Worcester, Massachusetts before studying at Columbia University, where he later obtained a doctorate of philosophy.

He traveled to the United States where he met with American Quakers before returning to Ramallah with his wife Ermina Jones Totah to teach at a school for Muslims in Jerusalem. During World War I he worked as a YMCA secretary for American Troops in France, having escaped the Turkish army after being forcibly conscripted. From 1914 to 1917 he was the pastor of the Westport Friends Meeting.

== Education work ==
Totah returned to Palestine in 1919, and in 1920 he was appointed to a teacher training college in Jerusalem, where he worked until 1925. He briefly returned to America to complete his Ph.D. at Columbia University but returned to Ramallah in 1927 to be principal of the Friends Boys' School.

He advocated for uniting Christian and Muslim education systems to combat Zionism, and argued for the importance of educating girls.

== Anti-Zionist activism ==
In 1937 he testified before the Peel Commission about the state of education in Palestine, which he criticized for not opposing Zionism and being under-funded in comparison to other Arab states under British control. Totah was opposed to the establishment of a Jewish state in Palestine from the beginning and called it imperialist, but acknowledged that European persecution of Jews and a desire for a cultural-national home played a role in the development of Zionism. Totah argued in favor of permitting Jewish emigration from Europe to Arab states as regular immigrants to escape persecution in Europe, but on the condition of rejection of the Balfour Declaration and the idea of a Jewish state and acceptance of living under Arab rule as part of a unified Arab Federation.

In 1944, he brought his family to America. From 1945 to 1950 he served as director of the Institute for Arab-American Affairs. In that capacity he traveled around America giving speeches in churches condemning American support for Israel and Zionism. He debated Zionist Maurice Samuel at a public town hall in 1947.

In March 1948, he expressed his opinion that the partition of Palestine would not succeed. After the partition her gave speeches criticizing the formation of Israel and urging America to support the creation of a Palestinian state instead, and expressed concern that supporting Israel would drag America deeper into the Cold War because the Soviet Union was supporting Jewish immigrants who moved to the area.

He returned to the Middle East in 1952, where he visited several countries in addition to returning to Ramallah.

He of a heart attack on 24 February 1955 in Whittier, California.

== See also ==
- Sa'ed Atshan - Palestinian Quaker anthropologist and academic
- Jean Zaru - Palestinian Quaker peace activist
