= Tace Sowle =

London-based printer and publisher

Tace Sowle, later Tace Sowle Raylton (1666–1749) was a London-based printer and a major publisher of early Quaker writings.

== Biography ==
Sowle's parents, Andrew and Jane Sowle, both worked as printers, and she took over her father's business in 1691 aged 25. She managed the press for fifty-eight years, and at her death was the oldest printer in London. Following her marriage to Thomas Raylton in 1706, she remained the head of the business and, unusually for the times, continued to use her original surname, being known as Tace Sowle Raylton. Sowle published a bibliography of her press's work, which is also one of the first bibliographies of Quaker writings.

A fund named after Sowle (using a variant spelling of her name), set up by Quakers United in Publishing, supports Quaker authors.
