= John Gummere =

American astronomer

John Gummere (1784-1845) was an American astronomer and one of the founders of Haverford College in Pennsylvania. He was born in 1784 near Willow Grove, Pennsylvania. His son Samuel James Gummere (1811-1874) was the first president of Haverford College, and his grandson Francis Barton Gummere (1855-1919) was an influential scholar of folklore and ancient languages and an alumnus of Haverford College.

In 1814, Gummere was elected as a member of the American Philosophical Society.

Gummere built the first observatory at Haverford College (erected about 1834), now commemorated by a plaque at its original location, after being replaced by the Strawbridge Observatory in 1850.

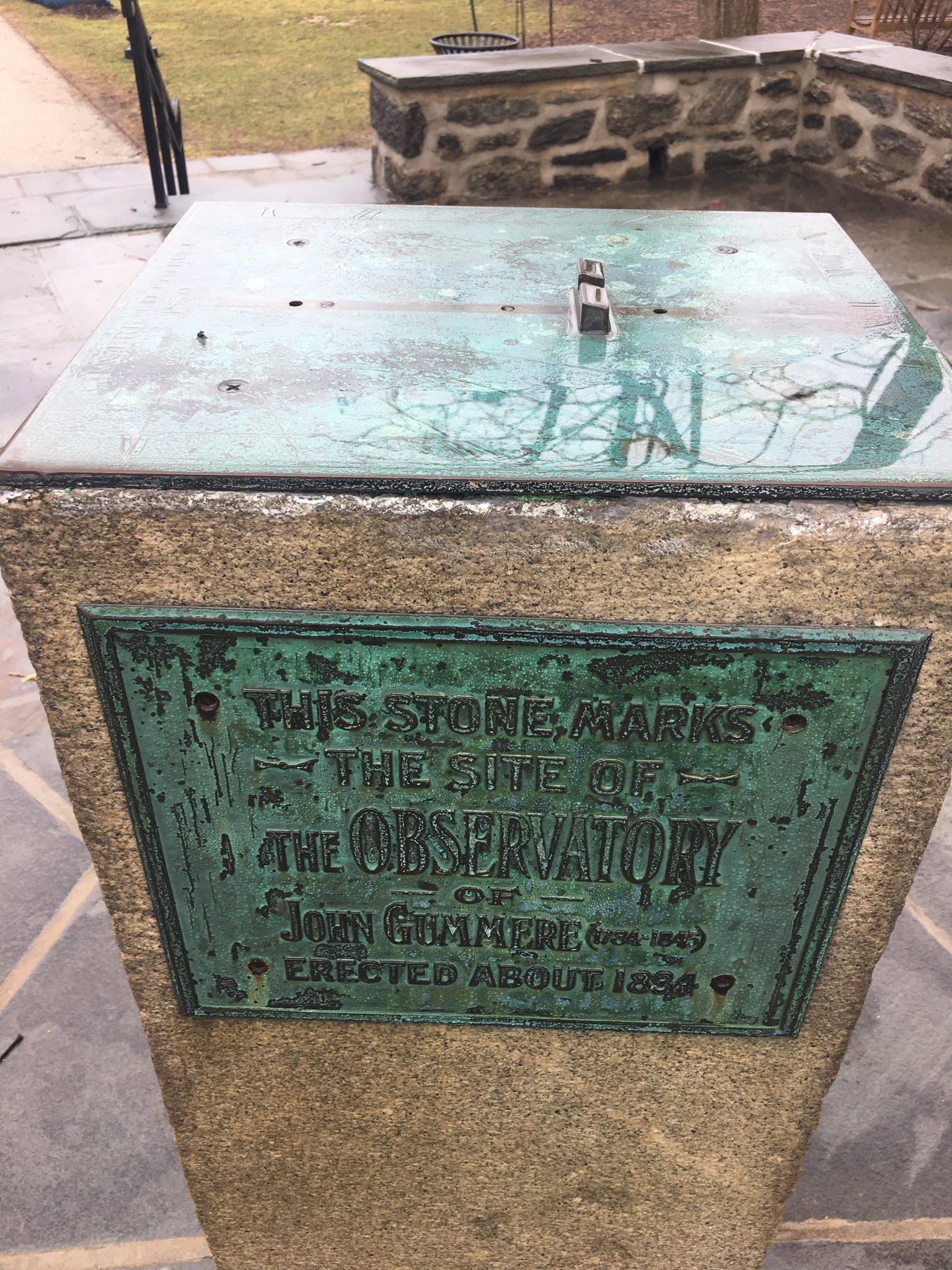
A plaque commemorating the location of the Gummere Observatory on the Haverford Campus. It reads "This stone marks the site of the Observatory of John Gummere (1784-1845). Erected about 1834."

== Bibliography ==
- Practical Astronomy, 1812
- Mathematical Tables, 1822
- A Treatise on Surveying, 1822
- An Elementary Treatise on Astronomy, 1842
