= 1683 =

1683 in various calendars
- Gregorian calendar: 1683; MDCLXXXIII
- Ab urbe condita: 2436
- Armenian calendar: 1132; ԹՎ ՌՃԼԲ
- Assyrian calendar: 6433
- Balinese saka calendar: 1604–1605
- Bengali calendar: 1089–1090
- Berber calendar: 2633
- English Regnal year: 34 Cha. 2 – 35 Cha. 2
- Buddhist calendar: 2227
- Burmese calendar: 1045
- Byzantine calendar: 7191–7192
- Chinese calendar: 壬戌年 (Water Dog); 4380 or 4173 — to — 癸亥年 (Water Pig); 4381 or 4174
- Coptic calendar: 1399–1400
- Discordian calendar: 2849
- Ethiopian calendar: 1675–1676
- Hebrew calendar: 5443–5444
- Hindu calendars
- Vikram Samvat: 1739–1740
- Shaka Samvat: 1604–1605
- Kali Yuga: 4783–4784
- Holocene calendar: 11683
- Igbo calendar: 683–684
- Iranian calendar: 1061–1062
- Islamic calendar: 1094–1095
- Japanese calendar: Tenna 3 (天和３年)
- Javanese calendar: 1605–1606
- Julian calendar: Gregorian minus 10 days
- Korean calendar: 4016
- Minguo calendar: 229 before ROC 民前229年
- Nanakshahi calendar: 215
- Thai solar calendar: 2225–2226
- Tibetan calendar: ཆུ་ཕོ་ཁྱི་ལོ་ (male Water-Dog); 1809 or 1428 or 656 — to — ཆུ་མོ་ཕག་ལོ་ (female Water-Boar); 1810 or 1429 or 657

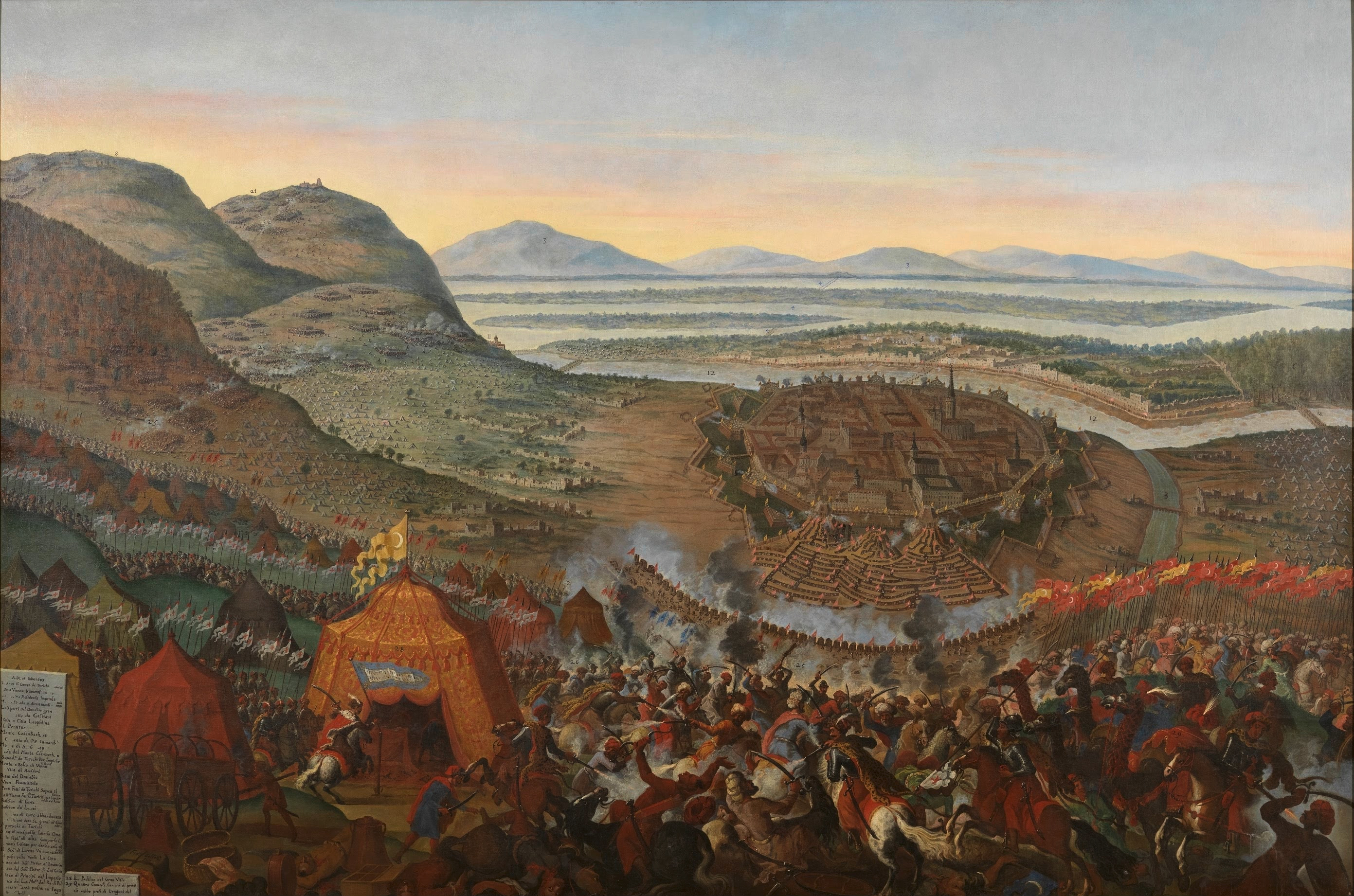
September 12: European armies turn back Ottoman Empire's attempt to conquer Central Europe in Battle of Vienna (painting by Frans Geffels prior to 1694)

1683 (MDCLXXXIII) was a common year starting on Friday of the Gregorian calendar and a common year starting on Monday of the Julian calendar, the 1683rd year of the Common Era (CE) and Anno Domini (AD) designations, the 683rd year of the 2nd millennium, the 83rd year of the 17th century, and the 4th year of the 1680s decade. As of the start of 1683, the Gregorian calendar was 10 days ahead of the Julian calendar, which remained in localized use until 1923.

== Events ==
=== January–March ===
- January 5 – The Brandenburger-African Company, of the German state of Brandenburg, signs a treaty with representatives of the Ahanta tribe (in modern-day Ghana), to establish the fort and settlement of Groß Friedrichsburg, in honor of Frederick William, Elector of Brandenburg. The location is later renamed Princes Town, also called Pokesu.
- January 6 – The tragic opera Phaëton, written by Jean-Baptiste Lully and Philippe Quinault, is premiered at the Palace of Versailles.
- January 27 – Gove's Rebellion breaks out in the Province of New Hampshire in North America as a revolt against the Royal Governor, Edward Cranfield. Most of the participants, and their leader Edward Gove, are arrested. Gove is convicted of treason but pardoned three years later.
- February 7 – The opera Giustino by Giovanni Legrenzi and about the life of the Byzantine Emperor Justin, premieres in Venice.
- March 14 – Ageng Tirtayasa, Sultan of Banten on the island of Java (part of modern-day Indonesia), is captured by soldiers hired by the Dutch East India Company.
- March 17 – In a battle at Kalyan (near Bombay) between the Maratha Empire and the Mughal Empire in India, Maratha General Hambirrao Mohite defeats the local Mughal official, Ranamast Khan.
- March 22 – Great fire in Newmarket, Suffolk, England, consuming half the houses and forcing King Charles II (who is in residence) to flee the town.
- March 31 – Authorized representatives of King John III Sobieski of Poland and Emperor Leopold I of the Holy Roman Empire sign a military alliance treaty in Warsaw.

=== April–June ===
- April 10 – Charles V, Duke of Lorraine is appointed commander of the Imperial Army of the Holy Roman Empire.
- May 3 – Sultan Mehmed IV of the Ottoman Empire enters Belgrade.
- May 24 – The Ashmolean Museum opens in Oxford (England), as the world's second university museum, after the establishment of the Kunstmuseum Basel in 1661 by the University of Basel.
- June 12 – The Rye House Plot to assassinate Charles II of England is discovered.

=== July–September ===
- July 8 – Admiral Shi Lang of Qing dynasty China leads 300 ships with 20,000 troops out of Tongshan, Fujian, and sails towards the Kingdom of Tungning, in modern-day Taiwan and Penghu, in order to quell the kingdom in the name of the Qing.
- July 14 – A 173,000-man Ottoman force arrives at Vienna, and starts to besiege the city.
- July 16–17 – Battle of Penghu: Qing Chinese admiral Shi Lang defeats the naval forces of Zheng Keshuang decisively.
- July 21 – The gruesome execution of Lord Russell, for his role in the 1683 Rye House Plot to assassinate King Charles II of England, is carried out by the royal executioner Jack Ketch, who wields his axe in a manner requiring multiple blows to make Russell suffer as much as possible during the beheading.
- August 4 – Turhan, in the powerful role of the Valide sultan of the Ottoman Empire since 1648 as the mother of Sultan Mehmed IV, dies at the age of 56, bringing an end to the era in Ottoman history known as the "Sultanate of Women". Upon the overthrow of Mehmed IV four years later, the role of the mother of the Ottoman Sultan is less powerful.
- August 18 – Francesco Maria Imperiale Lercari becomes the new Doge of the Republic of Genoa.
- August 20 – Bahadur, son of the Emperor Aurangzeb of the Mughal Empire in India, is dispatched along with other Mughal nobles on an invasion of Konkan, the area on the southwestern Indian coast under the control of the Maratha Empire.
- August 25 – The Earl of Limerick, Irishman Thomas Dongan, takes office as the new British Colonial Governor of the Province of New York and makes major reforms to restore public order and rescue the province from bankruptcy.
- September 5 – Qing Chinese admiral Shi Lang receives the formal surrender of Zheng Keshuang, ushering in the collapse of the Kingdom of Tungning, which is then incorporated into the Qing Empire.
- September 12
  - Battle of Vienna: The Ottoman siege of the city is broken with the arrival of a force of 70,000 Poles, Austrians and Germans under Polish–Lithuanian king Jan III Sobieski, whose cavalry turns their flank. The victory marks a turning point in the Ottoman Empire's fortunes and the end of the Turkish attempt to expand its control into Western Europe.
  - Pedro II becomes the King of Portugal after having served as regent since 1668 for his older brother Afonso VI.

=== October–December ===
- October 3 – Shi Lang reaches Taiwan and occupies modern-day Kaohsiung.
- October 6 – Germantown, Philadelphia is founded as the first permanent German settlement in North America (in 1983 U.S. President Ronald Reagan declares a 300th Year Celebration, and in 1987, it becomes an annual holiday, German-American Day).
- October 9 (possible date) – Louis XIV of France makes a morganatic marriage with Madame de Maintenon in a secret ceremony following the death on July 30 of his queen consort, Maria Theresa of Spain.
- November 1 – The English crown colony of the Province of New York is subdivided into 12 counties: Albany, Dutchess, Orange, Ulster, and Westchester (upstate); Kings, New York County, Queens, Richmond (within New York City); Suffolk (eastern Long Island), and two areas not in New York state, Dukes County (now in Massachusetts) and Cornwall County (now 11 counties in Maine).
- December 7 – Algernon Sidney, opponent of King Charles II of England and author of the rebel tract Discourses Concerning Government is beheaded after having been arrested on June 25 and found guilty on November 7.
- December 25
  - Kara Mustafa Pasha, Grand Vizier of the Ottoman Empire since 1676, is executed on orders of Sultan Mehmed IV after being blamed for the Ottoman loss of the Battle of Vienna on September 12. The execution is carried out in Belgrade as Kara Mustafa is strangled with a silk cord. The Sultan appoints Bayburtlu Kara Ibrahim Pasha as the new Grand Vizier.
  - George Ducas, the Prince of Moldavia installed by the Ottomans in 1678, is arrested by Polish authorities while on his way back to Bucharest from the defeat by Poland in the Battle of Vienna. Ducas is replaced by Ștefan Petriceicu.
- December 27 – Richard Keigwin leads a rebellion against the East India Company to take over as Governor of Bombay and most of the British territory in India, driving out Governor Sir John Child and arresting the Deputy Governor, Charles Ward. Keigwin surrenders the office less than a year later.
- December – The River Thames in England freezes, allowing a frost fair to be held.

=== Date unknown ===
- Wild boars are hunted to extinction in Britain.

== Births ==
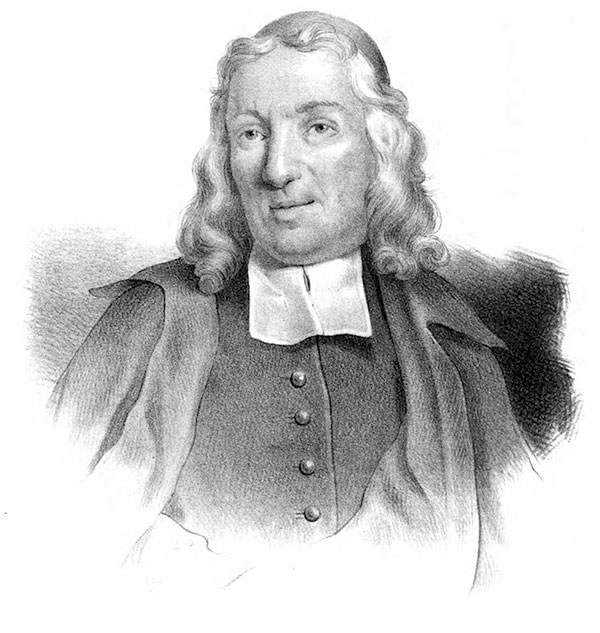
Jacob Benzelius born 25 February

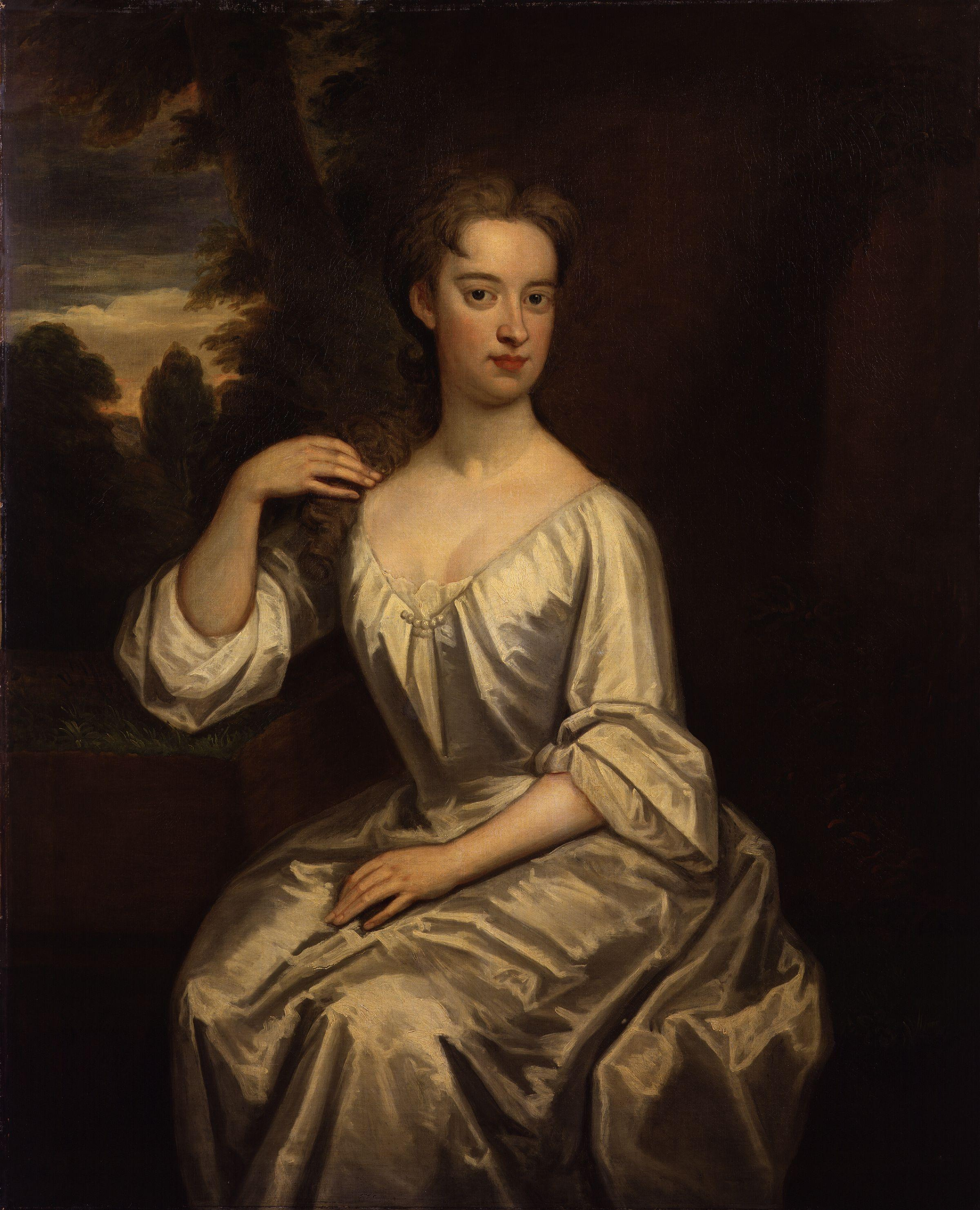
Anne Spencer, Countess of Sunderland (1683–1716) born 27 February

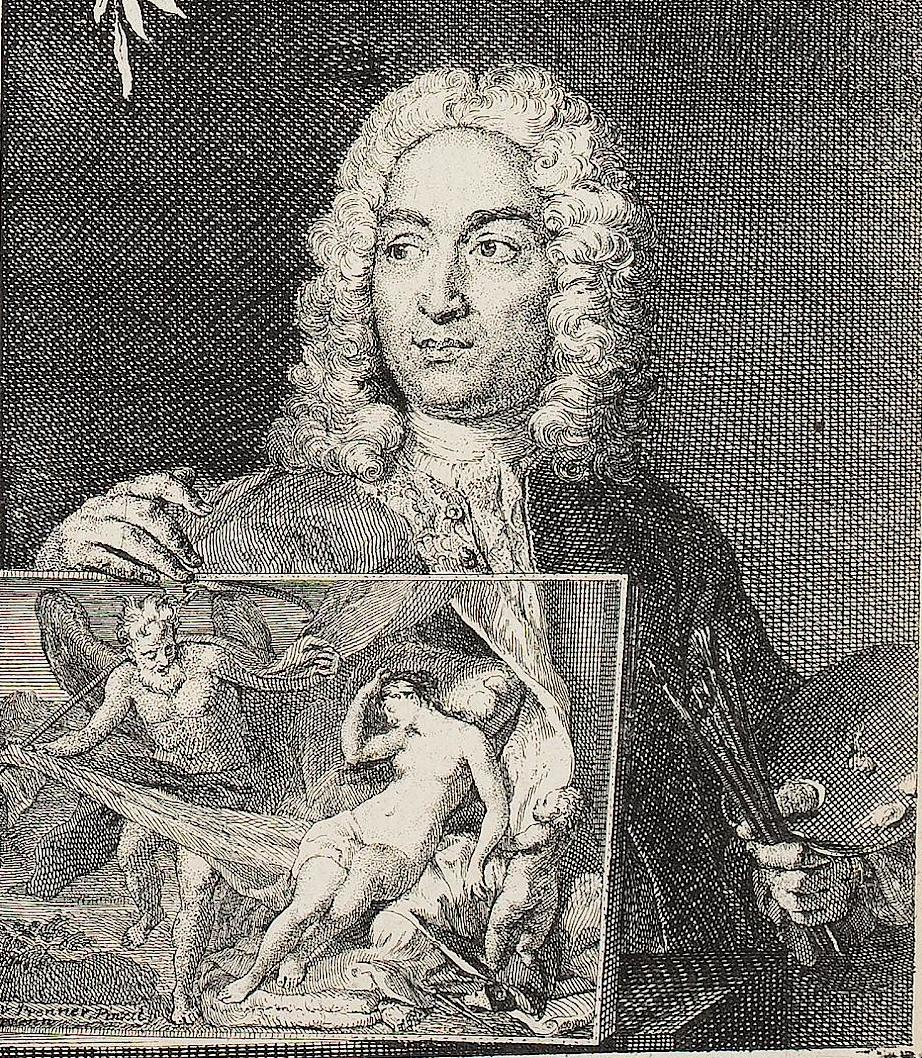
Anton Joseph von Prenner born 7 March

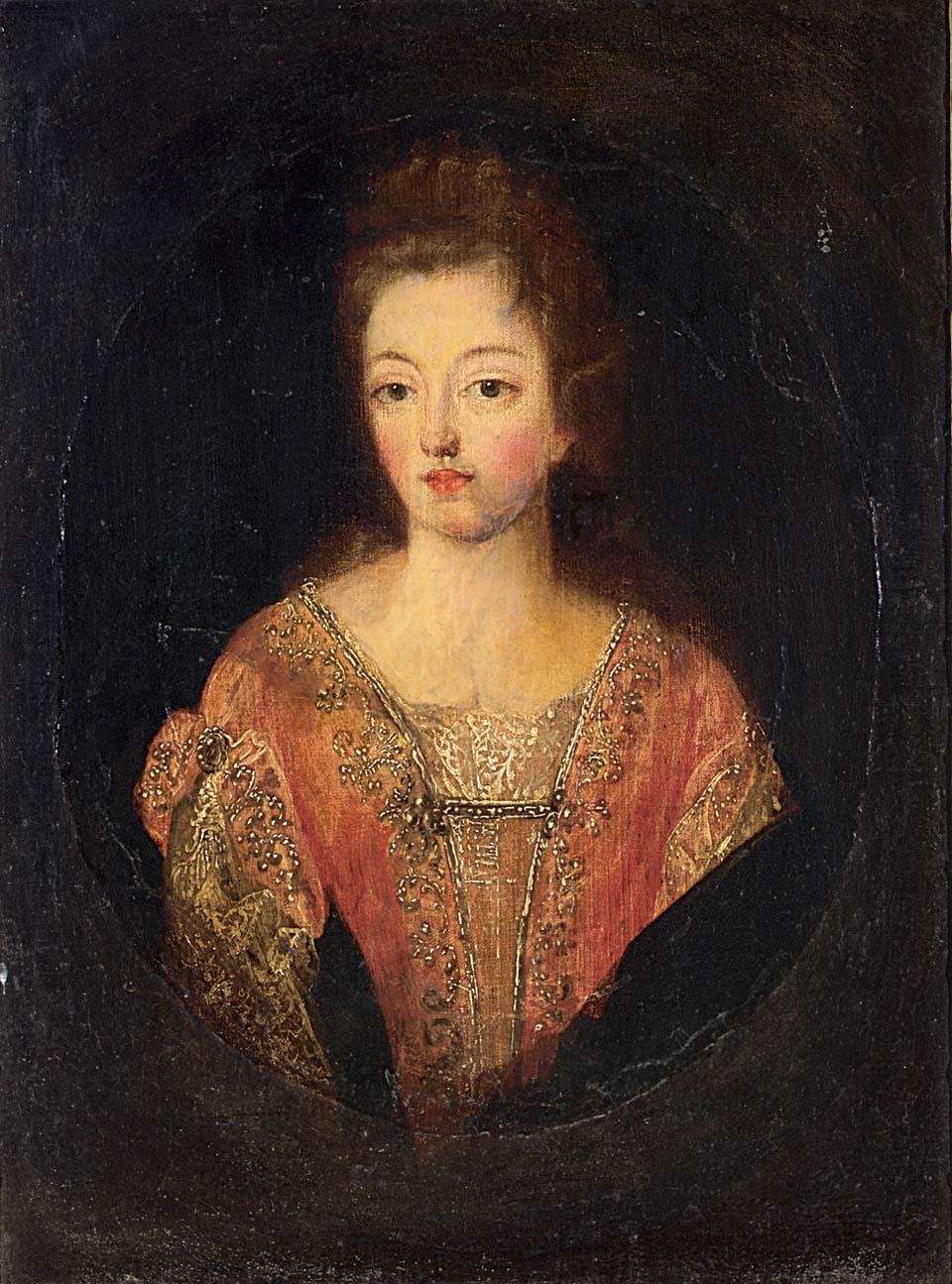
Countess Sophia Albertine of Erbach-Erbach born 30 July

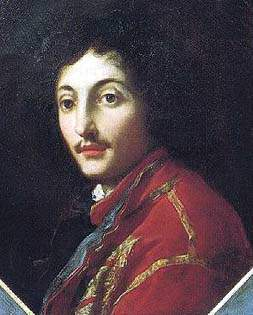
Giuliano Dami born 14 September

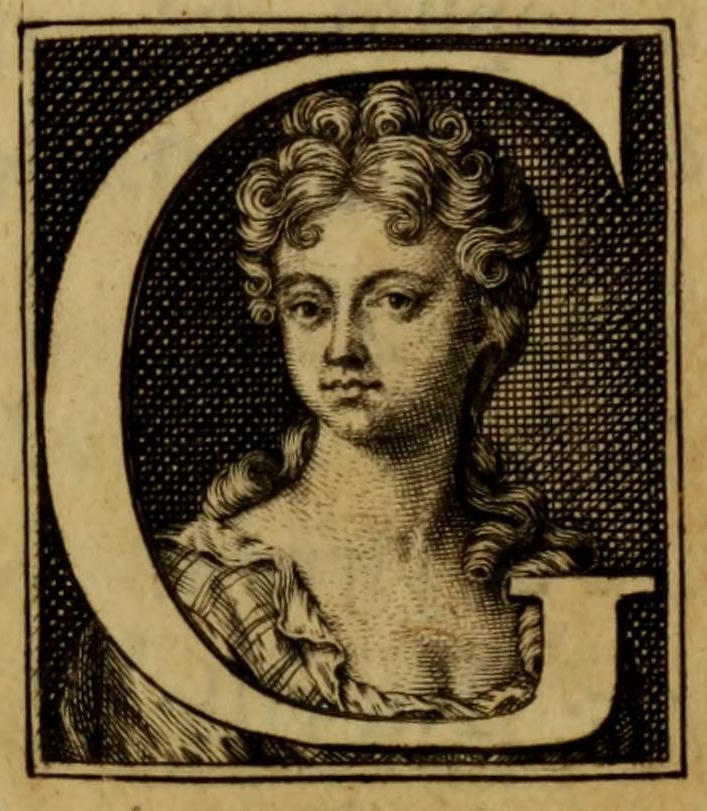
Elizabeth Elstob born 29 September

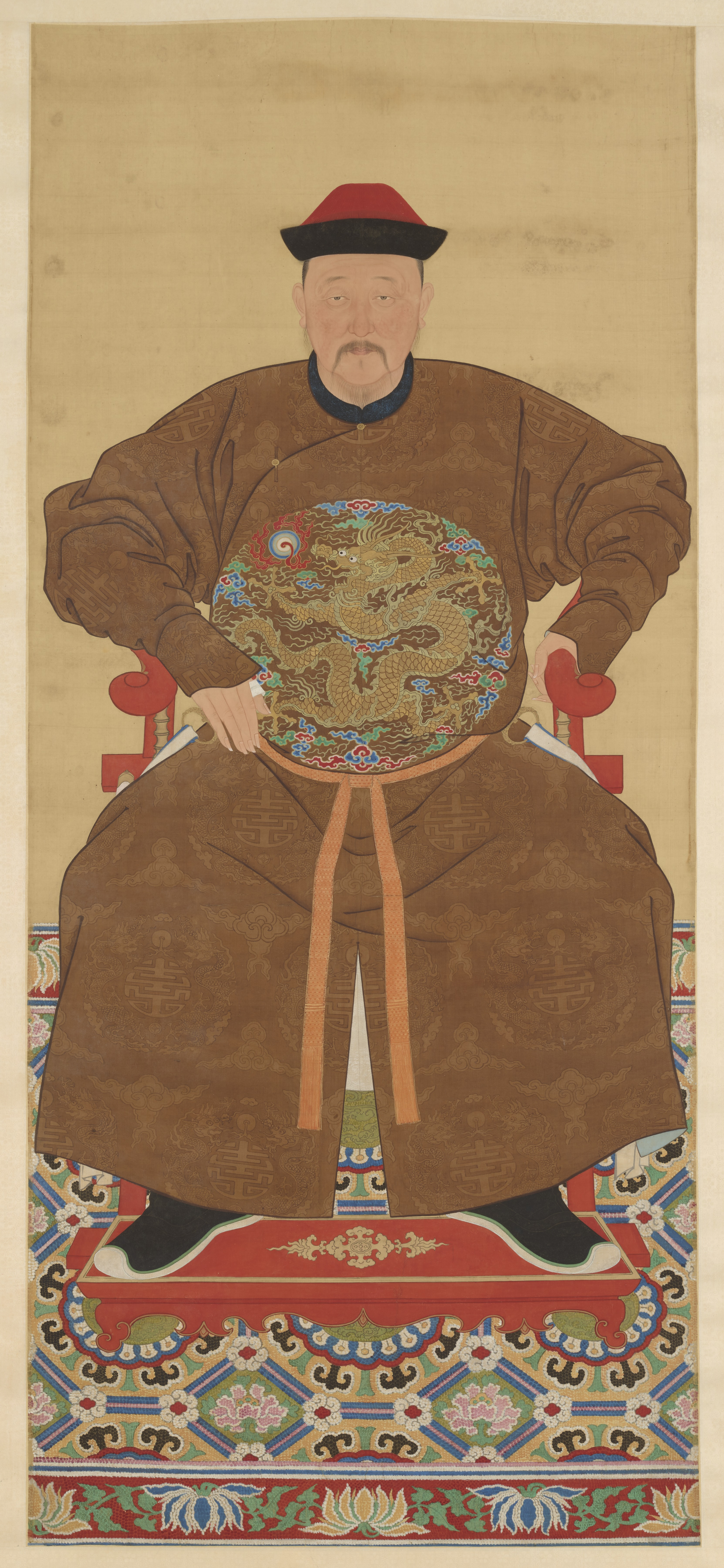
Yuntang born 17 October

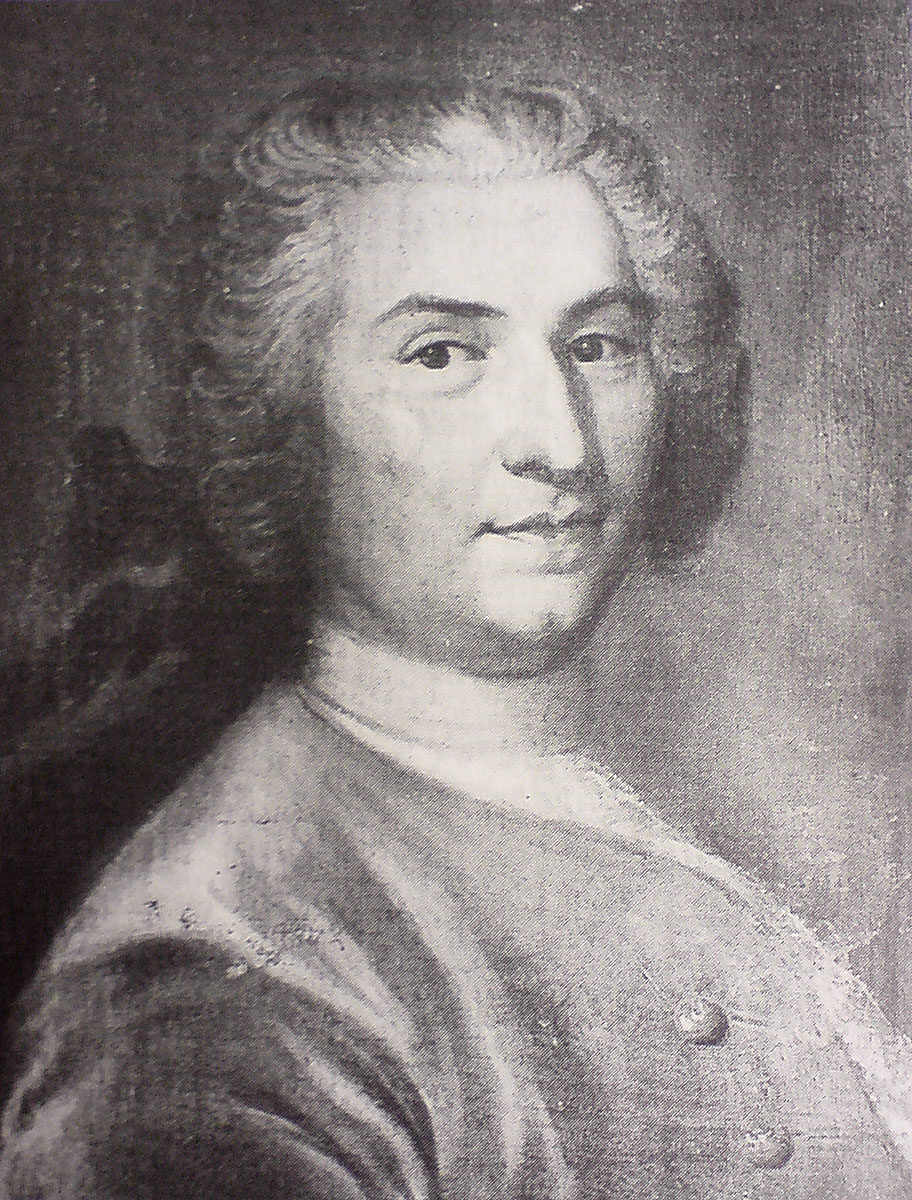
Carl Georg Siöblad born 2 November

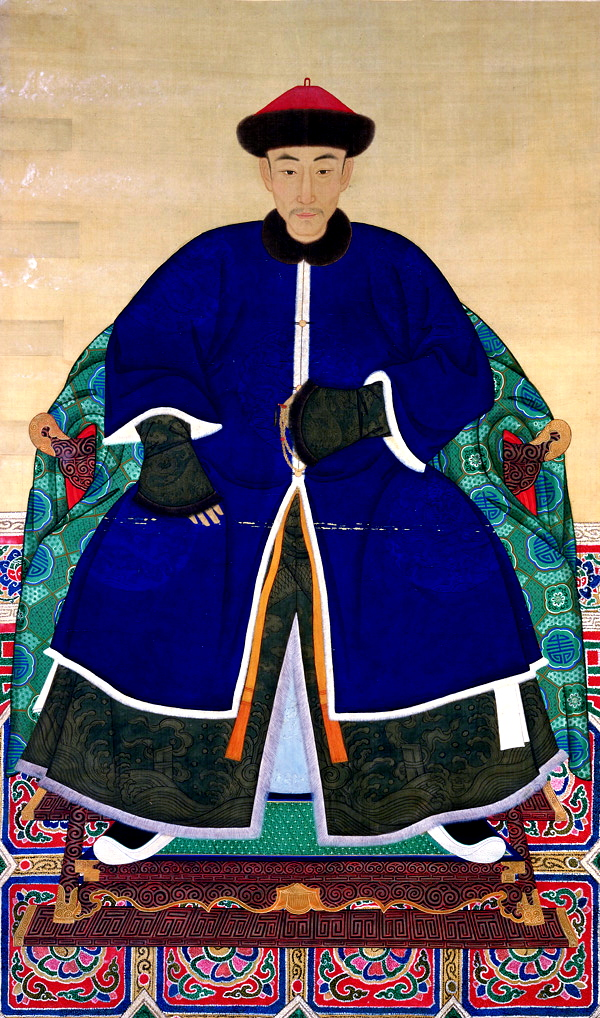
Yun'e born 28 November

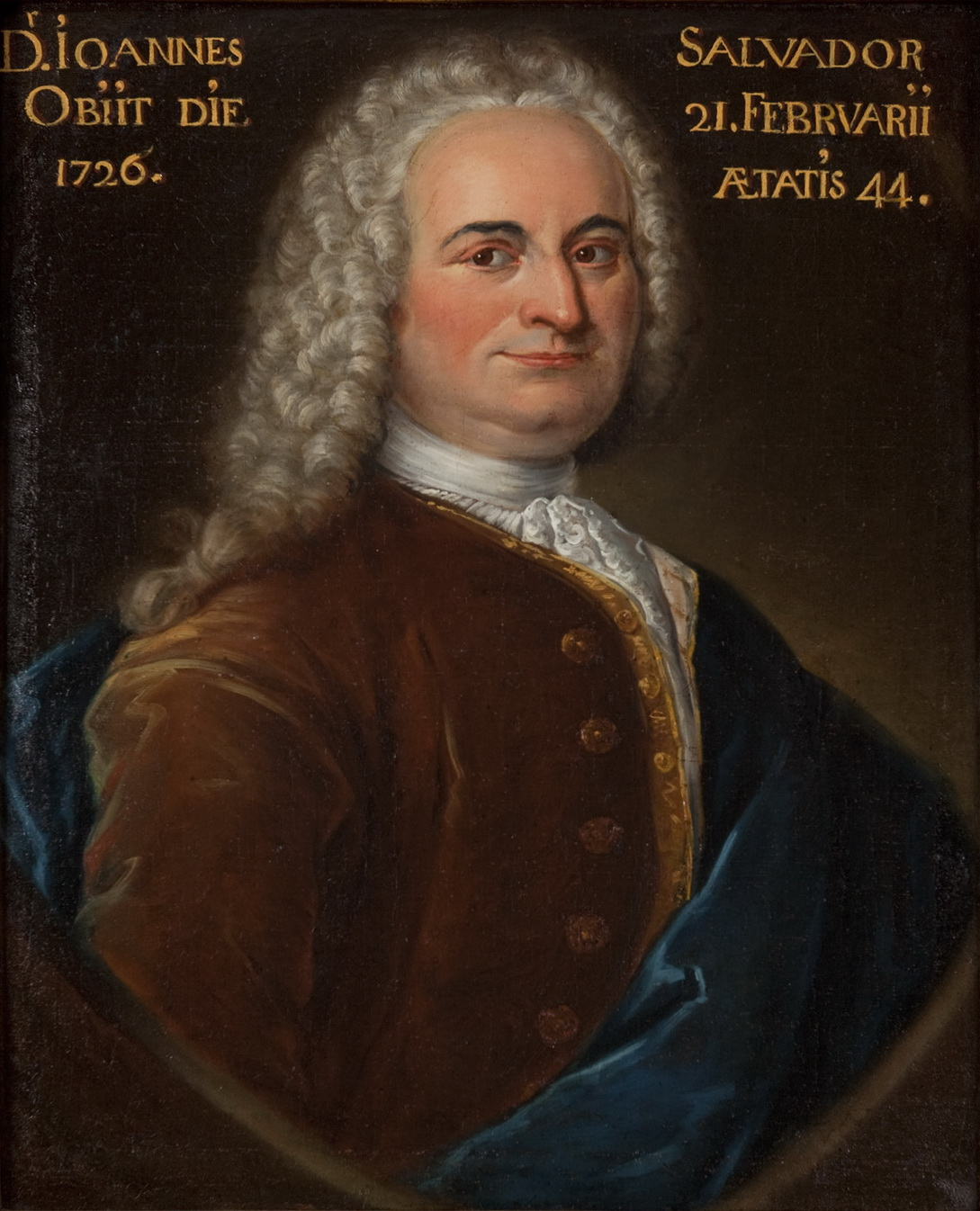
Joan Salvador i Riera born 1 December

=== January–March ===
- January 10 – Philip van Dijk, painter from the Dutch Republic (d. 1753)
- January 13 – Christoph Graupner, German composer (d. 1760)
- January 14 – Gottfried Silbermann, German builder of keyboard instruments (d. 1753)
- January 29 – Juan de Galavís, Spanish Catholic Archbishop of Santo Domingo, Bogotá (d. 1739)
- February 4
  - Jean-Baptiste Bénard de la Harpe, French explorer of North America (d. 1765)
  - Judah Monis, North American instructor of the Hebrew language (d. 1764)
- February 9 – Alexander von Dönhoff, Prussian lieutenant-general, confidant of King Friedrich Wilhelm I (d. 1742)
- February 14 – Daniel Waterland, English theologian (d. 1740)
- February 18
  - Friedrich Adolph Lampe, German Pietist pastor (d. 1729)
  - Claus Paarss, Danish military officer and official (d. 1762)
- February 21 – Johann Christoph Wolf, German Christian Hebraist (d. 1739)
- February 22
  - Bernhard Pez, Austrian Benedictine historian and librarian (d. 1735)
  - Zacharias Conrad von Uffenbach, German scholar (d. 1734)
- February 24 – Johan Eberhard Carlberg, Swedish fortification officer and architect (d. 1773)
- February 25 – Jacob Benzelius, Archbishop of Uppsala in the Church of Sweden (d. 1747)
- February 27 – Anne Spencer, Countess of Sunderland (d. 1716)
- February 28 – René Antoine Ferchault de Réaumur, French scientist (d. 1757)
- March 1
  - Caroline of Ansbach, British queen and regent, wife of George II of Great Britain (d. 1737)
  - Abiell Whichello, English composer and organist (d. 1747)
- March 2 – Hans Reinhold von Fersen, Swedish count (d. 1736)
- March 3 – Johann Christoph Schmidt, musician and music copyist to Handel (d. 1763)
- March 7 – Anton Joseph von Prenner, Austrian painter (d. 1761)
- March 8 – Lydia Lancaster, British Quaker minister (d. 1761)
- March 12 – John Theophilus Desaguliers, French-born British natural philosopher, assistant to Isaac Newton (d. 1744)
- March 13 – Johann Wilhelm Weinmann, German apothecary and botanist (d. 1741)
- March 15
  - Claude-Michel Bégon de la Cour, French military officer, governor of Trois-Rivières (d. 1748)
  - Charles Louis Bretagne de La Trémoille, 6th Duke of Thouars (d. 1719)
- March 18 – Ralph Verney, 1st Earl Verney (d. 1752)
- March 24 – Mark Catesby, English naturalist, studied the flora and fauna of the New World (d. 1749)

=== April–June ===
- April 17
  - Georg Caspari, Baltic German academic (d. 1743)
  - Johann David Heinichen, German Baroque composer and music theorist (d. 1729)
- April 21 – James Lockwood, member of the Connecticut House of Representatives from Norwalk (d. 1769)
- April 25 – Markus Hansiz, Jesuit historian (d. 1766)
- May 4 – James Allen, educationalist (d. 1746)
- May 15 – Christian Louis II, Duke of Mecklenburg-Schwerin (d. 1756)
- May 20 – Elijah Fenton, English poet, biographer and translator (d. 1730)
- May 29 – Antoine Pesne, French-born court painter of Prussia (d. 1757)
- May 31 – Jean-Pierre Christin, French physicist (d. 1755)
- June 2 – Thomas-Simon Gueullette, French lawyer (d. 1766)
- June 6 – Adriaan Nijs, Flemish sculptor active in the Waasland (d. 1771)
- June 23 – Étienne Fourmont, French orientalist (d. 1745)
- June 24 – Sir Richard Everard, 4th Baronet, British soldier, the fourth governor of North Carolina (d. 1733)

=== July–September ===
- July 5 – Peder Colbjørnsen, Norwegian timber merchant and war hero (d. 1738)
- July 10 – John Hedworth, British colliery owner and politician (d. 1747)
- July 11 – Caspar Neumann, German chemist and apothecary (d. 1737)
- July 12 – John Perceval, 1st Earl of Egmont (d. 1748)
- July 16 – Pierre-Claude Fontenai, French Jesuit priest and historian (d. 1742)
- July 19 – Stefano de Mari, admiral (d. 1759)
- July 23 – Johann Friedrich Schannat, historian from the Holy Roman Empire (d. 1739)
- July 26 – Carlo Alberto Guidoboni Cavalchini, Italian Cardinal (d. 1774)
- July 27 – Jan Pieter van Bredael the Younger, Flemish painter (d. 1735)
- July 30 – Countess Sophia Albertine of Erbach-Erbach (d. 1742)
- August 2 – Pietro Righini, Italian architect and scenic designer (d. 1742)
- August 8 – Henry Newport, 3rd Earl of Bradford, English peer and politician (d. 1734)
- August 17
  - Henry Grey, British Whig politician (d. 1740)
  - Teodor Lubomirski, Polish nobleman who became Starost (d. 1745)
- August 18 – Guy Auguste de Rohan-Chabot, French nobleman noted for an altercation with Voltaire (d. 1760)
- August 21 – Gabriele Valvassori, Italian architect of the late-Baroque period (d. 1781)
- August 22 – Erdmann II, Count of Promnitz (d. 1745)
- September 7 – Maria Anna of Austria, Archduchess of Austria and Queen consort of Portugal (d. 1754)
- September 11 – Farrukhsiyar, Mughal Emperor (d. 1719)
- September 14 – Giuliano Dami, favourite and valet (Aiutante di Camera) of Gian Gastone de' Medici (d. 1750)
- September 15 – Charles Eversfield, British Tory politician and MP (d. 1749)
- September 25 – Jean-Philippe Rameau, French composer (d. 1764)
- September 29 – Elizabeth Elstob, pioneering scholar of Anglo-Saxon (d. 1756)

=== October–December ===
- October 12 – Charlotta von Liewen, politically active Swedish countess (d. 1735)
- October 14 – Prudentius Maran, French Benedictine scholar (d. 1762)
- October 16 – Juan Bautista de Orendáin y Azpilicueta, Spanish politician and prime minister (d. 1734)
- October 17 – Yuntang, born Aixinjueluo Yintang, Qing prince (d. 1726)
- October 20 – Francis Howard, 1st Earl of Effingham, English peer and army officer (d. 1743)
- October 25 – Charles FitzRoy, 2nd Duke of Grafton, British peer and politician (d. 1757)
- November 2 – Carl Georg Siöblad, Swedish naval officer, Governor of Malmöhus and Blekinge Counties (d. 1754)
- November 3 – Iver Elieson, Norwegian businessman (d. 1753)
- November 10 – King George II of Great Britain (d. 1760)
- November 12 – Christopher Layer, English lawyer (d. 1723)
- November 16 – Frederik Fabritius, Danish court goldsmith to Christian VI (d. 1755)
- November 21 – Lucy Burwell Berkeley, white American aristocrat of the Burwell family of Virginia (d. 1716)
- November 28 – Yun'e, Manchu prince of the Qing dynasty of China (d. 1741)
- November 30 – Ludwig Andreas von Khevenhüller, Austrian field marshal (d. 1744)
- December 1 – Joan Salvador i Riera, pharmacist and naturalist from Barcelona (d. 1726)
- December 4 – Shem Drowne, colonial coppersmith and tinplate worker in Boston (d. 1774)
- December 5
  - John St Clair, Master of Sinclair, Scottish Army officer and Tory politician (d. 1750)
  - Georg Friedrich Christian Seekatz, German painter (d. 1750)
- December 6 – Samuel Vernon, silversmith (d. 1737)
- December 11 – Thomas Howard, 8th Duke of Norfolk, English peer and politician (d. 1732)
- December 13 – Bernardo de' Dominici, Italian art historian and minor painter (d. 1759)
- December 15 – Charles Schomberg, Marquess of Harwich, British Army officer and nobleman (d. 1713)
- December 19
  - William Gordon, Lord Strathnaver, Scottish politician (d. 1720)
  - King Philip V of Spain (d. 1746)
  - Bernhard Vogel, German engraver of genre scenes and portraits (d. 1737)
- December 21 – Carlo Bergonzi, Italian luthier (d. 1747)
- December 23 – François Nicole, French mathematician (d. 1758)
- December 27 – Conyers Middleton, English clergyman (d. 1750)
- December 31 – William Brownlow, Anglo-Irish politician (d. 1739)
- date unknown
  - Anna Maria Thelott, Swedish artist (d. 1710)
  - Benedicta Margareta von Löwendal, German industrialist (d. 1776)

== Deaths ==
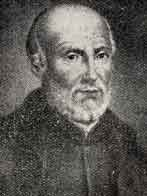
Julien Maunoir

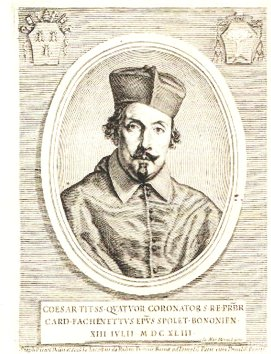
Cesare Facchinetti

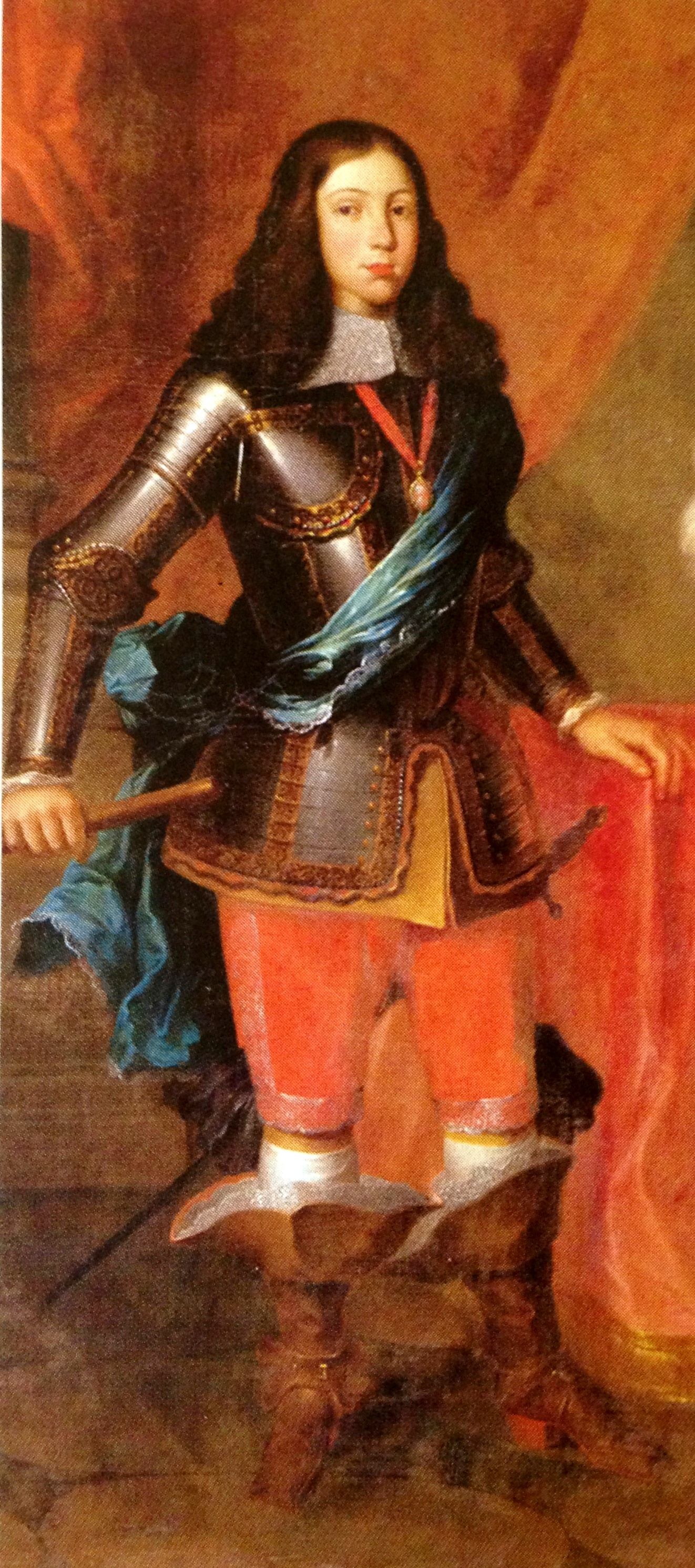
Afonso VI of Portugal

- January 2 – Sir Thomas Twisden, 1st Baronet, English politician (b. 1602)
- January 14 – Edward Thurland, English politician (b. 1607)
- January 15 – Philip Warwick, English writer and politician (b. 1609)
- January 21 – Anthony Ashley Cooper, 1st Earl of Shaftesbury, British politician (b. 1621)
- January 28 – Julian Maunoir, French Jesuit priest (b. 1606)
- January 30 – Cesare Facchinetti, Italian Roman Catholic cardinal (b. 1608)
- February 18 – Nicolaes Pieterszoon Berchem, Dutch painter (b. 1620)
- February 27 – Engel de Ruyter, Dutch admiral (b. 1649)
- February 28 – Johann Paul Freiherr von Hocher, Austrian chancellor (b. 1616)
- March 6 – Guarino Guarini, Italian architect of the Piedmontese Baroque (b. 1624)
- March 8 – Robert Paston, 1st Earl of Yarmouth, English politician, earl (b. 1631)
- March 11 – Giovanni Bernardo Carboni, Italian painter (b. 1614)
- March 14 – Robert Montagu, 3rd Earl of Manchester, English politician (b. 1634)
- March 16 – Henrik Bjelke, Norwegian military officer (b. 1615)
- March 19 – Thomas Killigrew, English dramatist (b. 1612)
- April 28 – Daniel Casper von Lohenstein, German writer, diplomat and lawyer (b. 1635)
- March 29 – Yaoya Oshichi, young Japanese girl burned at the stake for arson (b. 1667)
- May 2 – Stjepan Gradić, Croatian philosopher and scientist (b. 1613)
- May 15 – John Ernest II, Duke of Saxe-Weimar (b. 1627)
- June 4 – Wolfgang George Frederick von Pfalz-Neuburg, German bishop (b. 1659)
- July 7 – Elisabeth Henriette of Hesse-Kassel, daughter of William VI (b. 1661)
- July 10 – François Eudes de Mézeray, French historian (b. 1610)
- July 13 – Arthur Capell, 1st Earl of Essex, English statesman (b. 1631)
- July 21 – William Russell, Lord Russell, English politician (b. 1639)
- July 26 – Jean Le Vacher, French Lazarist missionary and French consul (b. 1619)
- July 30 – Maria Theresa of Spain, French queen, married to Louis XIV of France (b. 1638)
- August 4 – Turhan Hatice Sultan, Ottoman Valide Sultan, married to Ibrahim and the mother of Sultan Mehmed IV (b. 1627)
- August 18 – Charles Hart, English actor (b. 1625)
- August 22 – Sir John Hobart, 3rd Baronet, English landowner and politician (b. 1628)
- August 24 – John Owen, English non-conformist theologian (b. 1616)
- September 6 – Jean-Baptiste Colbert, French minister of finance (b. 1619)
- September 12 – King Afonso VI of Portugal (b. 1643)
- September 17 – John Campanius, Swedish Lutheran minister in New Sweden (b. 1601)
- October 1 – John Hull, colonial American merchant and politician (b. 1624)
- October 8 – Philipp Friedrich Böddecker, German organist and composer (b. 1607)
- October 9 – Francesco Caetani, 8th Duke of Sermoneta, Governor of the Duchy of Milan (b. 1613)
- October 25 – William Scroggs, lord chief justice of England (b. c. 1623)
- November 10
  - John Collins, English mathematician (b. 1625)
  - Robert Morison, Scottish botanist and taxonomist (b. 1620)
- November 16 – Margareta Huitfeldt, Norwegian-Swedish noble (b. 1608)
- November 29 – John Wright, British politician (b. 1615)
- December 7
  - John Oldham, English poet (smallpox) (b. 1653)
  - Algernon Sidney, English politician (b. 1623)
- December 13 – Anna Sophia II, Abbess of Quedlinburg, Abbesses of Quedlinburg (b. 1638)
- December 15 – Izaak Walton, English writer (b. 1593)
- December 16 – John Knight, Member of the Parliament of England (b. 1613)
- December 25 – Samuel Clarke, English writer and priest (b. 1599)
- December 27 – Maria Francisca of Savoy, Queen consort of Portugal (b. 1646)

=== Date unknown ===
- Birgitta Durell, Swedish industrialist (b. 1616)
- Roger Williams, English theologian and colonist (b. 1603)
