= Felicia Herman =

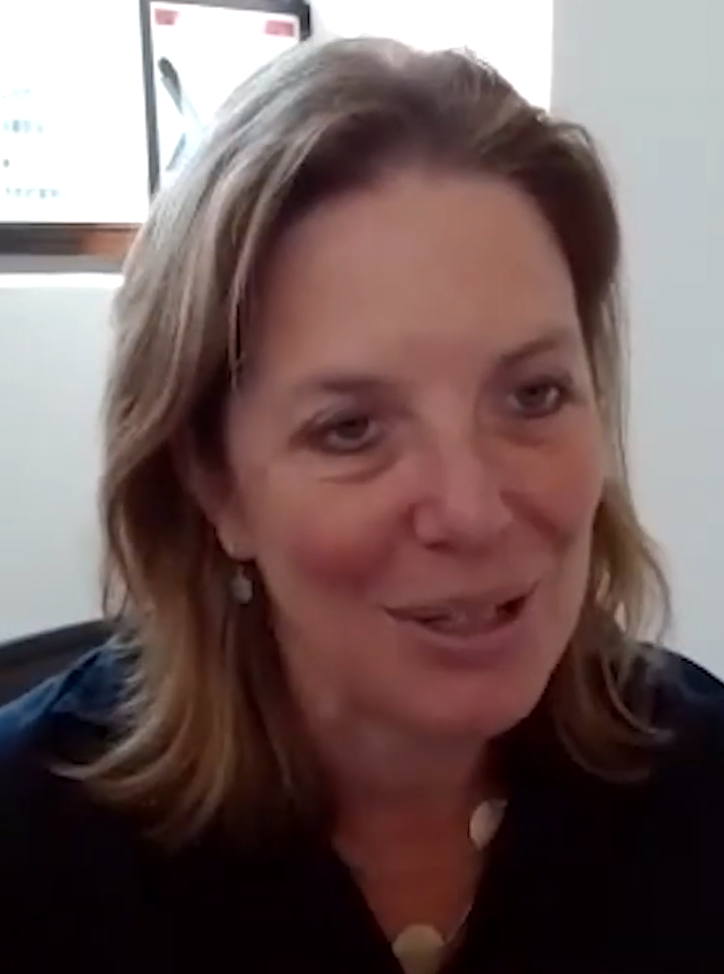
- Herman in 2021
- Born: Felicia Deborah Herman
- Education: Wellesley College; Brandeis University
- Occupations: Historian, philanthropy professional

Felicia Deborah Herman is an American historian and nonprofit administrator in the field of Jewish philanthropy. She is Managing Director, North America, of the Maimonides Fund. She is the associate editor of SAPIR: A Journal of Jewish Conversations and president of the board of the American Jewish Historical Society.

== Early life and education ==
Herman grew up in New Jersey in a Conservative Jewish household. As a child, she was diagnosed with dyslexia and attended a specialized school where she was not permitted to learn Hebrew. She attended high school in West Windsor, New Jersey. During high school in 1987, she participated in a student exchange program to West Germany.

Herman attended Wellesley College, where she majored in religion. She spent her junior year, from 1991 to 1992, studying at Hebrew University of Jerusalem. After graduating, she pursued graduate studies at Brandeis University, earning an M.A. in Jewish women's studies and a Ph.D. in American Jewish history. Her doctoral dissertation, completed in February 2002 under the supervision of Jonathan Sarna, was titled Views of Jews: Antisemitism, Hollywood, and American Jews, 1913-1947.

== Career ==
Herman worked for a year as an assistant to the director at the Yeshiva University Museum. While a doctoral student at Brandeis, she worked part-time at the American Jewish Historical Society, where she created finding aids for the archive's collections related to women. As she was completing her dissertation, she accepted a part-time position at the Steinhardt Foundation, working for Rabbi Yitz Greenberg and his son, JJ Greenberg, z"l.

In 2005, Herman was appointed executive director of the Natan Fund, a giving circle that supports Jewish and Israeli social innovation. She held this role for 16 years. While at Natan, she founded Amplifier, a network for Jewish giving circles that was later acquired by the Jewish Federations of North America, and Shomer Collective, an organization focused on bringing Jewish wisdom to end-of-life experiences. She became president of Natan in 2021 and then joined the board when she left Natan for Maimonides Fund.

In April 2020, at the start of the COVID-19 pandemic, Herman was seconded to direct the Aligned Grant Program of the Jewish Community Response and Impact Fund (JCRIF), a coalition of foundations providing emergency support to American Jewish non-profit organizations during the pandemic.

In 2021, Herman joined Maimonides Fund as Chief Operating Officer. In 2023, she became Managing Director, North America.

Herman is the president of the board of the American Jewish Historical Society and is also on the boards of Natan and the DreamStreet Theatre Company. She is a recipient of the JJ Greenberg Memorial Award from the Jewish Funders Network. In 2021, The Jerusalem Post ranked her number 42 on its list of the "Top 50 Most Influential Jews."
