= Bret Stephens =

American journalist (born 1973)

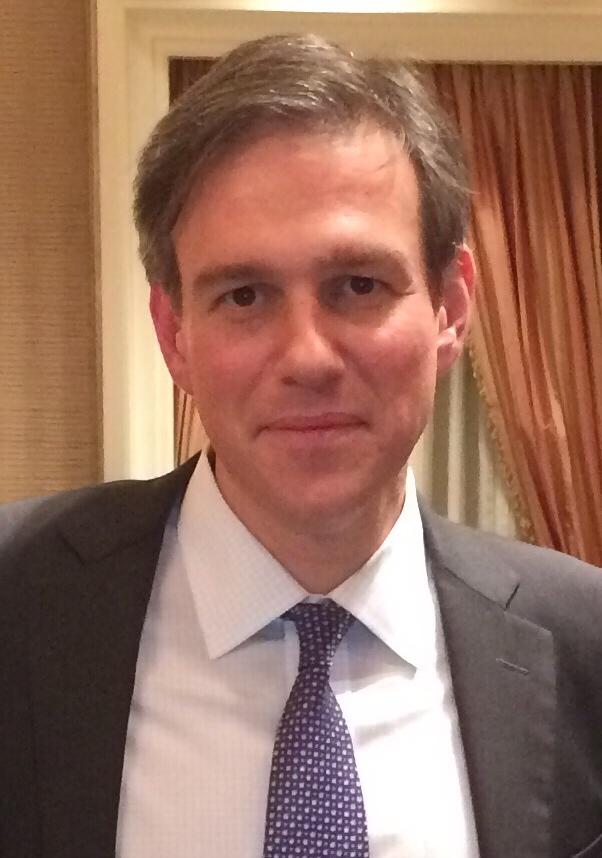
- Stephens in 2015
- Born: Bret Louis Stephens; November 21, 1973 (age 52); New York City, U.S.
- Education: University of Chicago (BA); London School of Economics (MSc)
- Occupations: Political commentator; columnist; editor
- Years active: 1995–present
- Spouses: Pamela Paul (m. 1998, divorced): Corinna da Fonseca-Wollheim
- Children: 3

Bret Louis Stephens (born November 21, 1973) is an American conservative columnist. He has been an opinion columnist for The New York Times and a senior contributor to NBC News since 2017. Since 2021, he has been the inaugural editor-in-chief of SAPIR: A Journal of Jewish Conversations.

Stephens was previously a foreign affairs columnist and deputy editorial page editor at The Wall Street Journal, overseeing the editorial pages of its European and Asian editions. From 2002 to 2004, he was editor-in-chief of The Jerusalem Post. At the Wall Street Journal, Stephens won the Pulitzer Prize for Commentary in 2013. Stephens is known for his neoconservative foreign policy views, including support for Israel and US military intervention in the Middle East, for being part of the right-of-center opposition to Donald Trump, and for commentary that has generated controversy on issues such as climate change, race, and Israel.

== Early life and education ==
Stephens was born in New York City, the son of Xenia and Charles J. Stephens, a former vice president of General Products, a chemical company in Mexico. Both of his parents were secular Jews. His mother was born in Italy at the start of World War II to Jewish parents who had fled Nazi Germany. His paternal grandfather, Louis Ehrlich, was born in 1901 in Kishinev (today Chișinău, Moldova). He fled with his family to New York after the Kishinev pogrom and changed the family surname to Stephens (after poet James Stephens).

As a teenager, he attended boarding school at Middlesex School in Concord, Massachusetts. Stephens earned an undergraduate degree from the University of Chicago, and a degree in comparative politics from the London School of Economics.

== Personal life ==
He is married to Corinna da Fonseca-Wollheim, a New York Times music critic. They have three children, and live in New York City. He was previously married to Pamela Paul, the former editor of The New York Times Book Review.

== Journalism career ==
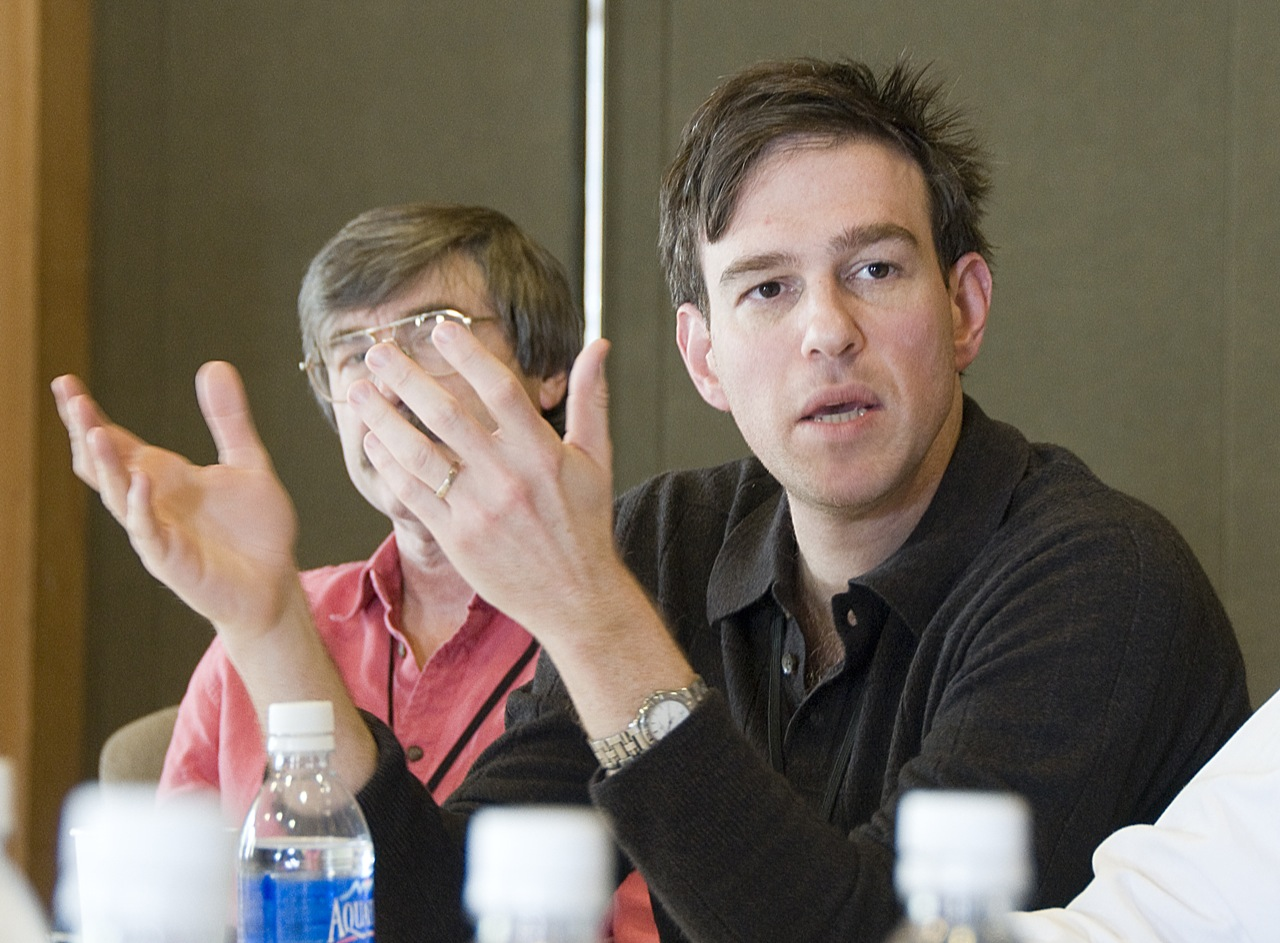
Stephens in 2008

Stephens began his career as an assistant editor at Commentary magazine in 1995–96. In 1998, he joined The Wall Street Journal as an op-ed editor. He later worked as an editorial writer for The Wall Street Journal Europe, in Brussels. Stephens edited the weekly "State of the Union" column on the European Union. In 2002, Stephens moved to Israel to become the editor-in-chief of The Jerusalem Post. He was 28 years old. Haaretz reported at the time that the appointment of Stephens, a non-Israeli, triggered some unease among senior Jerusalem Post management and staff.

Stephens left The Jerusalem Post in 2004 and returned to The Wall Street Journal. In 2006, he took over the Journal's "Global View" column. In 2017, Stephens left the Journal, joined The New York Times as an opinion columnist, and began appearing as an on-air contributor to NBC News and MSNBC. In 2021, Stephens became editor-in-chief of SAPIR: A Journal of Jewish Conversations, published by Maimonides Fund.

== Awards and recognition ==
In 2005, the World Economic Forum named Stephens a Young Global Leader. He won the 2008 Eric Breindel Award for Excellence in Opinion Journalism. In 2009, he was named deputy editorial page editor after Melanie Kirkpatrick's retirement. In 2010, Stephens won the Reason Foundation's Bastiat Prize.

Stephens won the 2013 Pulitzer Prize for Commentary for "his incisive columns on American foreign policy and domestic politics, often enlivened by a contrarian twist." He is a national judge of the Livingston Award.

Stephens has chaired two Pulitzer juries. In 2016, he chaired the one that awarded the Pulitzer Prize for International Reporting to Alyssa Rubin of The New York Times. In 2017, Stephens chaired the jury that awarded the Pulitzer Prize for Editorial Writing to Art Cullen of The Storm Lake Times. Stephens spoke at the University of Chicago's 2023 Class Day, during convocation weekend. His invitation provoked backlash from various student groups, including Students for Justice in Palestine, for his views about Israel.

== Published works ==
Stephens's book America in Retreat: The New Isolationism and the Coming Global Disorder was released in November 2014. In it, he argues that the US has been retreating from its role as the "world's policeman" in recent decades, which will lead to ever-greater world problems.

== Controversy ==
=== George Washington University ===
In August 2019, Stephens sent a complaint to a George Washington University (GWU) professor and the university's provost about a tweet in which the professor called Stephens a "bedbug". The topic of Stephens's next column was the "rhetoric of infestation" used by authoritarian regimes such as Nazi Germany. The column was interpreted as criticism of the GWU professor and other critics of Stephens. The controversy gained massive attention online, leading to then-president Donald Trump tweeting, "lightweight journalist Bret Stephens, a Conservative who does anything that his bosses at the paper tell him to do! He is now quitting Twitter after being called a 'bedbug.' Tough guy!"

=== Comments about antisemitism and race ===
In August 2016, The Wall Street Journal published a column by Stephens about an Egyptian judoka refusing to shake hands with his Israeli opponent after an Olympic match, in which Stephens called antisemitism "the disease of the Arab mind". Some readers criticized this as a racist generalization that all Arabs were antisemitic. After Stephens joined The New York Times, several reporters at the newspaper criticized Stephens's previous writings.

In a December 2019 column titled "The Secrets of Jewish Genius", Stephens contended that Ashkenazi Jews have a history of "alternative thinking" which has led them to be successful. This article led to accusations of eugenics and racism.^{[by whom?]} The column originally said that "Ashkenazi Jews might have a marginal advantage over their gentile peers when it comes to thinking better. Where their advantage more often lies is in thinking different." Following widespread criticism, The New York Times editors deleted the section of the column in which he appeared to claim that Ashkenazi Jews are genetically superior to other groups. The editors said that Stephens erred in citing an academic study by an author with "racist views" whose 2005 paper advanced a genetic hypothesis for the basis of intelligence among Ashkenazi Jews. The Times's deletion was criticized by Jonathan Haidt, Nadine Strossen, and Steven Pinker, who called it "surrender to an outrage mob".

In February 2021, Stephens wrote a column critical of the Times's dismissal of Donald McNeil for using a racial slur against African Americans in the context of a discussion with students of the slur's usage. Six students present on the occasion said that McNeil had used the word "in a way that they perceived as casual, unnecessary or even gratuitous", but one of them added that "McNeil's opinions didn't disparage African Americans". The Times spiked the column, but it was leaked to the New York Post, which published it. Stephens principally argued against the editor's initial position that the newspaper would "not tolerate racist language regardless of intent"; the editor subsequently backed down from that position.

== Political views ==
=== Foreign policy ===
Foreign policy was one of the central subjects of the columns for which Stephens won the Pulitzer Prize for Commentary. Critics have characterized his foreign policy opinions as neoconservative, part of a conservative political movement associated with President George W. Bush that advocates the use of military force abroad, particularly in the Middle East, as a way of promoting democracy there. Stephens was a "prominent voice" among the media advocates for the start of the 2003 Iraq War, for instance writing in a 2002 column that, unless checked, Iraq was likely to become the first nuclear power in the Arab world. Although the weapons of mass destruction used as a casus belli were never shown to exist, Stephens continued to insist as late as 2013 that the Bush administration had "solid evidence" for going to war. In March 2023, he published an op-ed in the New York Times titled "20 Years On, I Don’t Regret Supporting the Iraq War". He also argued strongly against the Iran nuclear deal and its preliminary agreements, claiming that they are a worse bargain even than the 1938 Munich Agreement with Nazi Germany.

=== Israel ===
Stephens is a supporter of Israel and considers himself a Zionist. He said that one of the reasons he left The Wall Street Journal for The Jerusalem Post was that he believed that Western media was getting Israel's story wrong. Stephens also said: "I do not think Israel is the aggressor here. Insofar as getting the story right helps Israel, I guess you could say I'm trying to help Israel." Stephens led The Jerusalem Post during the height of the Second Intifada and pointed the paper in a more neoconservative direction. He has said that he did not consider Israeli settlements in the West Bank to be illegal despite international law saying otherwise.

Stephens has supported Israel during the Gaza war and strongly opposed the Houthis, Hezbollah, and Hamas. He has criticized such groups for their violent actions towards Israel and has blamed Hamas for the ongoing conflict. In an opinion piece for The New York Times, Stephens called South Africa's genocide case against Israel a "moral obscenity" that supposedly misinterpreted quotes from Israeli officials. He pointed to the 1988 Hamas charter to claim that Hamas was a genocidal organization and accused Hamas of hiding behind civilians. Stephens opposes the characterization of Israel's action in Gaza as genocide, stating that there is "no evidence of an Israeli plan to deliberately target and kill Gazan civilians."

=== Global warming ===
Stephens is also known for his climate change contrarianism. He has been described as a climate change denier, but disavows that term, calling himself agnostic on the issue. Stephens considers climate change a "20-year-old mass hysteria phenomenon" and rejects the notion that greenhouse-gas emissions are an environmental threat. According to him, "it isn't science" and belongs in the "realm of belief" as it is a "sick-souled religion". He also mocks climate change activism as hysterical alarmism, denying that any significant temperature change will occur in the next 100 years and arguing that it distracts from more important issues, such as terrorism. Stephens claims that global warming activism is based on theological beliefs, rather than science, as an outgrowth of Western tendencies to expect punishment for sins.

Stephens has suggested that activists would be more persuasive if they were less sure of their beliefs. Stephens's positions on this issue led to a protest in 2013 over his Pulitzer citation omitting his climate change columns, and to a strong backlash against his 2017 hiring by The New York Times. In reaction, The New York Times praised Stephens's "intellectual honesty and fairness". As of October 28, 2022, Stephens said that he had come to accept the reality of anthropogenic climate change after a trip to Greenland with climate scientist John Englander, although he believes that markets are more effective than government at addressing the problem.

=== Gun rights ===
Stephens disagrees with the mainstream conservative support for the Second Amendment and has called for its repeal, but he does not support a ban on gun ownership.

=== Donald Trump ===
During the 2016 United States presidential election campaign, Stephens became part of the Stop Trump movement, regularly writing articles for The Wall Street Journal opposing Donald Trump's candidacy, and becoming "one of Trump's most outspoken conservative critics", according to Sam Reisman of Mediaite. Stephens has compared Trump to Italian dictator Benito Mussolini. After Trump was elected, Stephens continued to oppose him: in February 2017, Stephens gave the Daniel Pearl Memorial Lecture at the University of California, Los Angeles, and used the platform to denounce Trump's attacks on the media. His opposition to Trump continued after he moved to the Times. For instance, in 2018 he argued that by the same logic Republicans used to justify the impeachment of Bill Clinton, they should impeach Trump.

After the 2024 United States presidential election, Stephens published an opinion article in The New York Times acknowledging his past criticisms and reservations about Trump but concluding, "So here's a thought for Trump's perennial critics, including those of us on the right: Let's enter the new year by wishing the new administration well, by giving some of Trump's cabinet picks the benefit of the doubt, by dropping the lurid historical comparisons to past dictators, by not sounding paranoid about the ever-looming end of democracy, by hoping for the best and knowing that we need to fight the wrongs that are real and not merely what we fear, that whatever happens, this too shall pass."

== Published works ==
- America in Retreat: The New Isolationism and the Coming Global Disorder (November 2014), ISBN 978-1591846628
- Has Obama Made the World a More Dangerous Place? The Munk Debate on U.S. Foreign Policy (August 2015), ISBN 978-1770899964
- The Dying Art of Disagreement (December 2017), ISBN 9780648018902
