= Pornified =

2005 book by Pamela Paul

Pornified: How Pornography Is Transforming Our Lives, Our Relationships, and Our Families
- 2nd, 2006 edition cover
- Author: Pamela Paul
- Language: English
- Subject: Pornography
- Publisher: Henry Holt and Company
- Publication date: 2005
- Publication place: United States
- Media type: Print (hardcover)
- ISBN: 0-8050-7745-6

Pornified: How Pornography Is Transforming Our Lives, Our Relationships, and Our Families (alternately titled Pornified: How Pornography Is Damaging Our Lives, Our Relationships, and Our Families) is a 2005 book by American writer Pamela Paul, discussing the impact of ready access to pornography on Americans.

The book was selected as one of the best books of 2005 by The San Francisco Chronicle and was a New York Times Book Review Editor's Choice. Social conservatives such as Albert Mohler, president of the Southern Baptist Theological Seminary, endorsed the book enthusiastically, though he predicted it might "find a chilly reception in a society increasingly given over to the titillation, perversion, and profits offered by pornography".

The Washington Post Book World characterized the book as "A persuasive argument that today's pornography is not the Playboy centerfold or the Deep Throat of yesteryear...Paul's remedy charts a sensible middle ground between restraints and free speech." Sex columnist Amy Sohn, on the other hand, cared less for the book and argued in the New York Times Book Review that "Paul never gives credence to the many women who enjoy consuming porn, alone or with partners".

== See also ==
- Feminist sex wars
- Sexual objectification
- Sexualization
