= Parenting, Inc. =

2008 book by Pamela Paul

- Author: Pamela Paul
- Language: English
- Subject: Parenting
- Publisher: Times Books
- Publication date: April 2008
- Publication place: United States
- Media type: Print
- Pages: 320
- ISBN: 978-0-8050-8249-4 (hardcover)
- Dewey Decimal: 649/.1220284 22
- LC Class: HQ755.8 .P3983 2008

Parenting, Inc.: How We Are Sold on $800 Strollers, Fetal Education, Baby Sign Language, Sleeping Coaches, Toddler Couture, and Diaper Wipe Warmers—and What It Means for Our Children is a 2008 book by American writer Pamela Paul, discussing the industry that provides goods and services to the parents of young Americans.

The book has received reviews from The New York Times Book Review, The New York Observer, New York Post, and Reuters. The New York Observer credits the book with "debunking the most absurd of the baby-marketers' claims—including those behind the infamous Baby Einstein series." The New York Times, however, noted that the book concerns itself mostly with the situation of families in wealthy urban and suburban communities. A week later, the New York Times Book Review named the book an "Editors' Choice".
