= American Jewish Historical Society =

Non-profit organization in the USA

- Location within New York City
- Established: 1892
- Location: 15 West 16th Street; Manhattan, New York U.S. 10011
- Coordinates: 40.738047°N 73.993821°W
- Director: Gemma R. Birnbaum
- President: Felicia Herman
- Public transit access: Subway: 14th Street – Union Square
- Website: ajhs.org

The American Jewish Historical Society (AJHS) was founded in 1892 with the mission to foster awareness and appreciation of American Jewish history and to serve as a national scholarly resource for research through the collection, preservation and dissemination of materials relating to American Jewish history.

== History ==
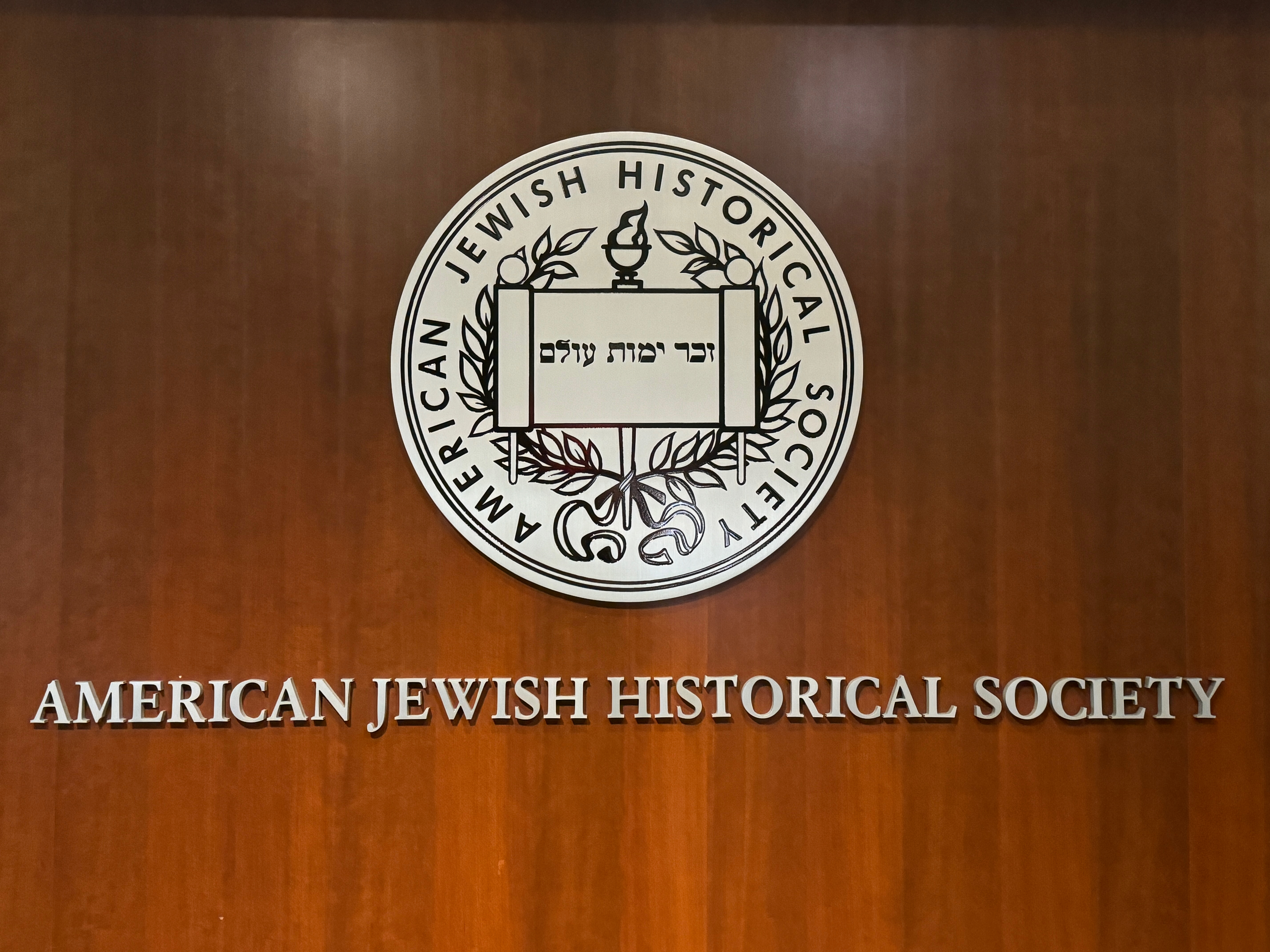
American Jewish Historical Society

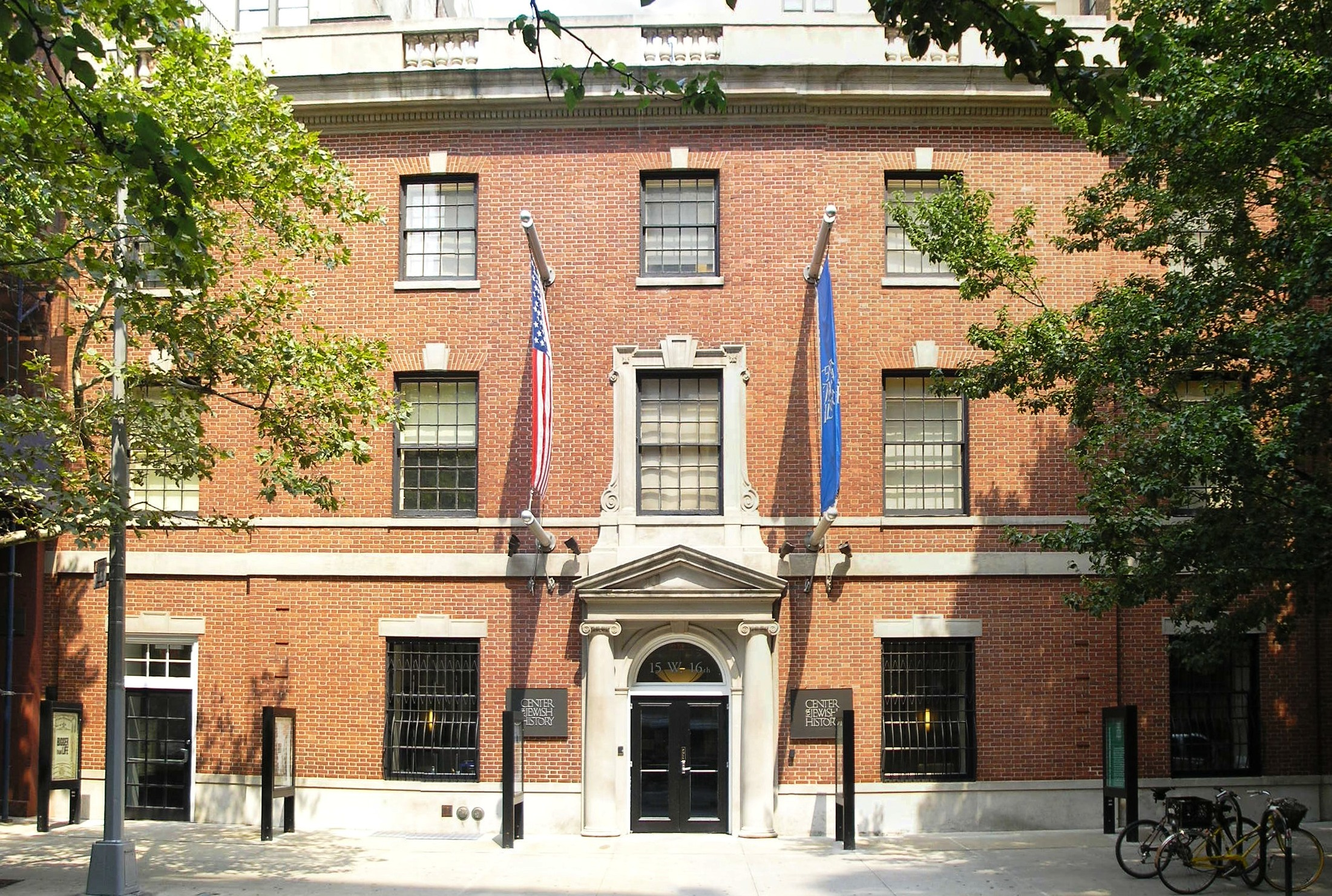
The Center for Jewish History on 16th Street

The American Jewish Historical Society (AJHS) is the oldest national ethnic historical organization in the United States. The Society's library, archives, photograph, and art and artifacts collections document the American Jewish experience. AJHS is located at the Center for Jewish History in Manhattan.

AJHS serves public educational and interpretive functions by publishing a journal, a newsletter, monographs and reference works; organizing and curating exhibits; and developing resources and curricula on the American Jewish experience.

In 2007, it was among over 530 New York City arts and social service institutions to receive part of a $20 million grant from the Carnegie Corporation, which was made possible through a donation by New York City mayor Michael Bloomberg.

== Past Presidents ==
- 1892–1898: Oscar S. Straus
- 1899–1921: Cyrus Adler
- 1921–1948: A.S.W. Rosenbach
- 1948–1952: Lee M. Friedman
- 1952–1954: Salo W. Baron
- 1954–1955: David de Sola Pool
- 1955–1958: Jacob Rader Marcus
- 1958–1961: Bertram Korn
- 1961–1964: Abram Kanof, MD
- 1964–1967: Leon J. Obermayer
- 1967–1969: Philip D. Sang
- 1969–1972: Abram Vossen Goodman
- 1972–1975: Abraham J. Karp
- 1975–1976: Maurice Jacobs
- 1976–1979: David R. Pokross
- 1979–1982: Saul Viener
- 1982–1985: Ruth B. Fein
- 1985–1988: Morris Soble
- 1988–1990: Phil David Fine
- 1990–1993: Ronald C. Curhan
- 1993–1998: Justin Wyner
- 1998–2003: Kenneth J. Bialkin
- 2003–2007: Sidney Lapidus
- 2007–2010: Daniel R. Kaplan
- 2011–2014: Paul B. Warhit
- 2014–2020: Bernard J. Michael
- 2020-present: Felicia Herman

== Publishing ==
The Society publishes books, a genealogy program, museums tours, academic assistance and other related educational activities. Additionally, the American Jewish Historical Society publishes the following publications:

- Heritage, a bi-yearly newsletter
- American Jewish History
- Jews in Sports Online

== Collections ==
The American Jewish Historical Society has some 40 million items in its archives, including manuscripts, printed material, photographs, audio files, film files, digital material, and objects. Important elements of the Society's collection include hundreds of historical manuscripts and other records of American Jewish groups, including the papers of the Council of Jewish Federations and Welfare Funds, the Synagogue Council of America, the American Jewish Congress, the American Jewish Committee, and the Hebrew Benevolent Society, as well as the papers of HIAS (formerly the Hebrew Immigrant Aid Society) from 1954 to 2000; United Jewish Appeal-Federation of New York and predecessor organizations from 1909 to 2004; and the American Soviet Jewry Movement.

The Society holds the original manuscript of The New Colossus by Emma Lazarus, as well as very early American Jewish documents, including Judah Monis's Hebrew grammar textbook (1735), the first American siddur for Jewish holidays printed in English (1761), and the first Hebrew-English prayerbook published in the United States (1826). The Society also holds documents from American Jewish Patriots of the American Revolution, including the marriage contract of Haym Salomon (1777). The Society's Loeb Portrait Database of American Jewish Portraits is a repository of more than 400 portraits of pre-1865 American Jews.

The Society also maintains the Jewish-American Hall of Fame, which was founded in 1969 at the Judah L. Magnes Museum in Berkeley, California, and became part of the American Jewish Historical Society in 2001.

== Exhibitions ==
- 2014: "October 7, 1944," multimedia exhibition created by choreographer Jonah Bokaer.

=== Online exhibitions & collections ===
- Jewish Museum in Cyberspace
- Jewish-American Hall of Fame
- Jews in Sport Online

== See also ==
- Texas Jewish Historical Society
