= Pamela Paul =

American journalist (born 1970s)

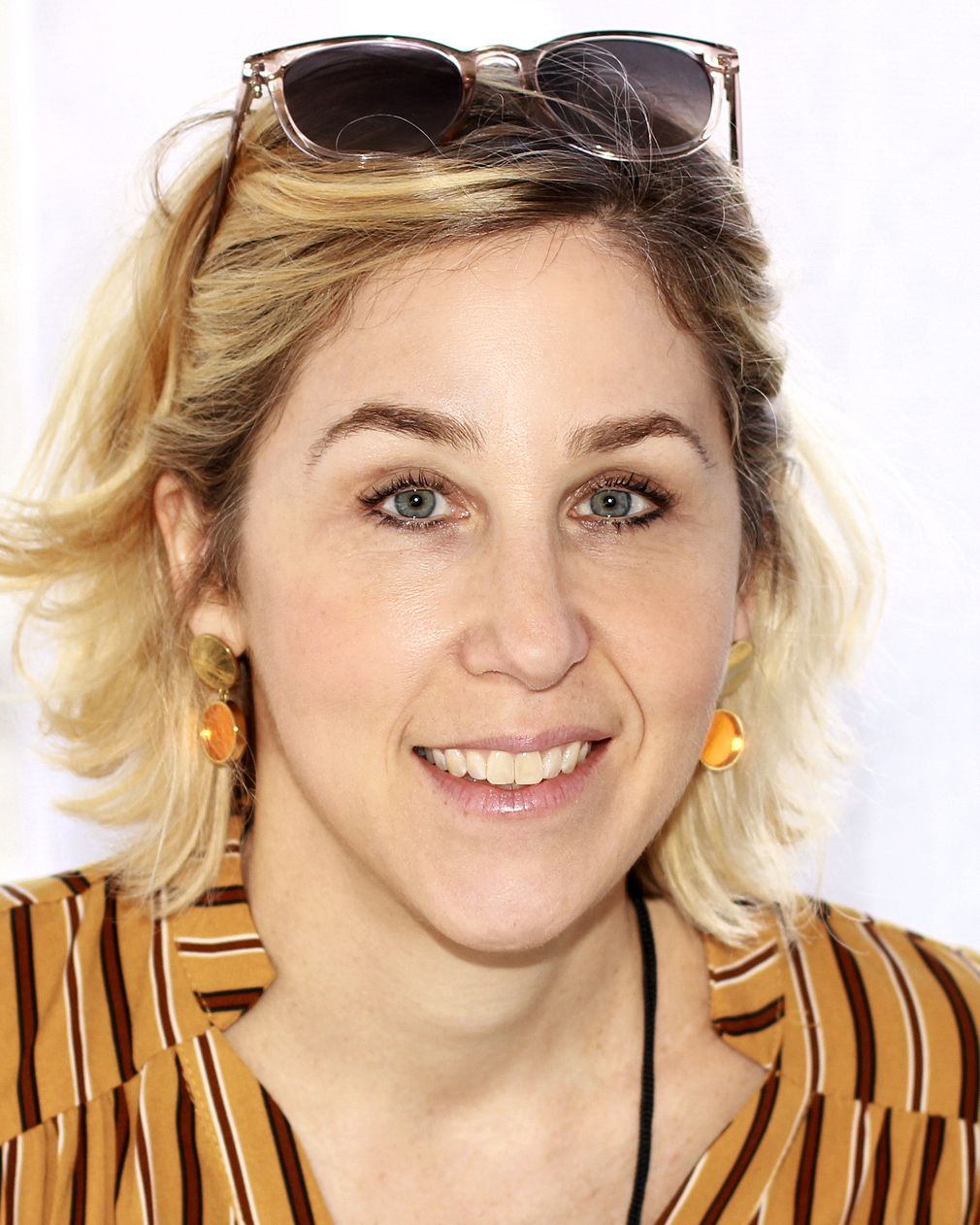
- At the 2019 Texas Book Festival
- Education: Brown University (BA)
- Occupations: Columnist; editor; journalist; author
- Spouses: Bret Stephens (m. 1998, divorced) Michael Stern (m. 2004)
- Writing career
- Years active: 1997–present
- Notable works: The Starter Marriage and the Future of Matrimony; Pornified; Parenting, Inc.
- Website: pamelapaul.com

Pamela Paul (born 1971 or 1972) is an American journalist, correspondent, editor, and author. She is writer at large for The Wall Street Journal. Previously, Paul had been an opinion columnist for The New York Times from 2022-2025, and from 2013-2022, Paul had been editor of The New York Times Book Review, including overseeing all New York Times book coverage including the staff critics and publishing news. At the Times, Paul received attention amidst controversy regarding her opinion and other writings on transgender issues, in particular with regard to medical treatment.

== Early life and education ==
Paul is the daughter of Carole and Jerome D. Paul. Paul's father was a construction contractor and her mother was an advertising copywriter and, later, the editor of Retail Ad World.

Paul graduated from Brown University in 1993 with an A.B.

== Career ==
Paul was a contributor to Time magazine and has written for many other publications, including Vogue, The Washington Post, The Atlantic, and Worth. She was a senior editor at the erstwhile magazine American Demographics, and was a London- and New York-based correspondent for The Economist, for which she wrote a monthly arts column from 1997 to 2002, and reviewed film, theater and books. The magazine also characterized her as "closely connected with The Economist."

In 2011, Paul joined The New York Times and wrote the Studied column, as well as serving as children's books editor and features editor for the Book Review.

In 2013 Paul was promoted to the editorship of the Book Review. Under her direction, the New York Times Book review moved rapidly to gender parity; in 2012, the year before Paul took the job, the Book Review covered 488 books by male authors and 237 by women. In 2014, female representation in the Book Review reached 47%. As Paul described it to C-SPAN, as reviewed by the Washington Post, "We try to bear in mind that the books that are of interest to our readers are multifaceted... There are so many distinctions that you could choose. Some people think of it very much just in terms of gender. We try to keep an eye on gender but that's just one of the factors. I would say that ethnicity and country of origin are something we pay a lot of attention to."

In 2016, her job expanded to oversee all books coverage for The New York Times—the Book Review, daily print reviews, and publishing news, both in print and online.

During her time as editor, she also hosted the Book Review's weekly podcast. Under her direction, it was described as one of the best books podcasts in the world.

She is the author of ten books. Her first book was The Starter Marriage and the Future of Matrimony, which was featured on The Oprah Winfrey Show, The Today Show, Politically Incorrect and Good Morning America. After the 2005 publication of her book Pornified, she testified about pornography to the Senate Judiciary Committee. She has also appeared on numerous podcasts, radio shows, and other television shows.

In March 2022, she moved from the Books section to the Opinion section at the New York Times. Her columns appeared in the Times weekly, and covered many topics, and attracted significant comment from Times readers, journalists in other publications, political groups such as FAIR, and academics. This included remarks that her critics deemed to be hostile to transgender people. Her writing from this period about the importance of reading received praise.

In 2025, Paul left the Times in a round of job cuts at the Opinion section. She joined the Wall Street Journal as a reporter three days later.

=== Transgender coverage criticism ===
Since 2022, Paul has written multiple columns on transgender topics in the New York Times. These articles have been described as transphobic by multiple journalists and transgender activists. On February 2, 2024, she published a 5,000-word piece entitled "As Kids, They Thought They Were Trans. They No Longer Do," which discussed the stories of 3 people who had received gender-affirming care starting at 17 or older and later detransitioned.

Four days after publication of Paul's February 2 opinion, in an article entitled "The NYT’s Latest Op-Ed on Trans Kids Has Already Been Cited in an Anti-Trans Legal Brief", James Factora reported that Paul's article appeared as a source in a legal document authored by the Alliance Defending Freedom, challenging an injunction against an Idaho law making it a felony to provide gender-affirming care to children. Human Rights Campaign had previously stated in a press release that Paul had written "irresponsible, biased news and opinion pieces about the transgender community".

The New York Times defended itself and Paul's opinion pieces as fact-checked according to Times standards, stating it had aimed to foster debate and open dialogue.

After she left the Times in 2025, Andrea Long Chu writing for New York Magazine described her transgender coverage as frequently promoting "the idea that trans kids are actually a vulnerable population of mentally ill children being preyed upon by a sinister medical Establishment eager to castrate them" and described Paul as "a zealot attired as a skeptic, one who has gladly paved the way for the anti-trans right".

== Personal life ==
Her first marriage, to Times columnist Bret Stephens, ended in divorce. In 2004, she married financial analyst Michael Stern.

Paul is non-religious, and has described herself as a "nonbeliever" and a "rationalist".

== Published works ==
=== Books ===
- Paul, Pamela (2003). The Starter Marriage and the Future of Matrimony. New York: Random House Trade Paperbacks. ISBN 9780812966763.
- — (2005). Pornified: How Pornography Is Transforming Our Lives, Our Relationships, and Our Families. New York: Times Books. ISBN 9780805081329.
- — (2008). Parenting, Inc. New York: Times Books/Henry Holt. ISBN 9780805082494.
- —, ed. (2014). By the Book: Writers on Literature and the Literary Life from The New York Times Book Review. New York: Henry Holt. ISBN 9781627791458.
- —, ed. (2017). My Life with Bob: Flawed Heroine Keeps Book of Books, Plot Ensues. New York: Henry Holt and Co. ISBN 9781627796316.
- —; Russo, Maria (2019). How to Raise a Reader. Workman. ISBN 978-1523505302.
- — (2021). Liza Kaplan (ed.). Rectangle Time. Illustrated by Becky Cameron. New York: Penguin Random House. ISBN 978-0-593-11511-4. OCLC 1155064464.
- — (2021). 100 Things We've Lost to the Internet (1st ed.). New York: Penguin Random House. ISBN 978-0-593-13677-5. OCLC 1236090469.
- — (2025). It Simply Can't Be Bedtime (1st ed.). New York: Penguin Random House. ISBN 978-0-593-53216-4.
- — (2026). The Path (1st ed.). New York: Penguin Random House. ISBN 978-0-593-53219-5.

=== Selected articles ===
- Paul, Pamela (October 6, 2003). "Calling It Off". Time Magazine. ISSN 0040-781X.
- Paul, Pamela (August 29, 2008). "With Child, With Cancer". The New York Times. ISSN 0362-4331.
- Paul, Pamela (July 22, 2009). "The Battle Over a Baby". The New York Times. ISSN 0362-4331.
- Paul, Pamela (February 16, 2023). "Opinion | In Defense of J.K. Rowling". The New York Times. ISSN 0362-4331.
- Paul, Pamela (February 2, 2024). "Opinion | As Kids, They Thought They Were Trans. They No Longer Do". The New York Times. ISSN 0362-4331.
- Paul, Pamela (June 25, 2026). "'Theo of Golden' Broke Every Rule in Publishing. It's an Unprecedented Bestseller". The Wall Street Journal. ISSN 0099-9660.
