= John Englander =

American oceanographer (born 1950)

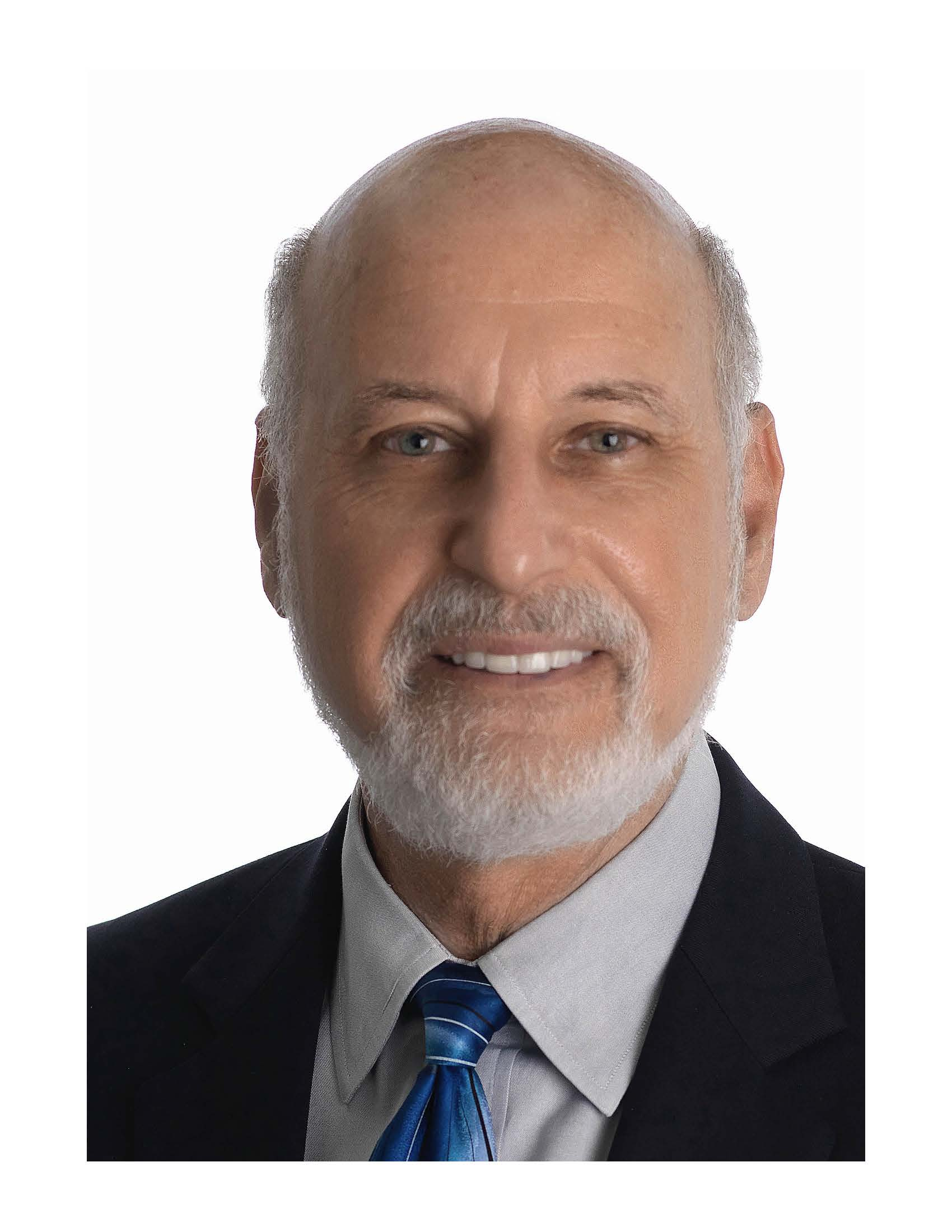
- Born: 1950 (age 75–76)
- Education: Dickinson College (BS)
- Scientific career
- Fields: Oceanography (sea level rise)
- Website: johnenglander.net

John Englander (born 1950) is an American oceanographer, consultant, and writer recognized as an expert on climate change and sea level rise. He is the director of the Rising Seas Institute at Nova Southeastern University in Fort Lauderdale, Florida, and has written two books on sea level rise. He is a resident of Boca Raton, Florida.

== Education and early career ==
According to Englander's LinkedIn profile, he attended the Tilton School. On his 18th birthday in 1968, Englander became a scuba instructor. He holds a Bachelor of Science degree in geology and economics from Dickinson College.

From 1974 to 1997, Englander was the owner of a sport diving business in Freeport, Bahamas. In 1997, Englander was personally recruited by Jacques Cousteau to serve as CEO of the Cousteau Society, a role he served in until Cousteau's death later that year.

== Scientific career ==
His first book, High Tide on Main Street: Rising Sea Level and the Coming Coastal Crisis, was published by The Science Bookshelf (Boca Raton) in 2012. It was named to the POLITICO 50 Reading List in 2016 by POLITICO Magazine. The book also received a positive review from Kyle M. Woosnam in the journal Community Development. A paid review in Foreword Reviews described Englander as a geologist and environmentalist and states that the book presents scientific research in an easy-to-understand way. Florida Atlantic University's Climate Science Investigations curriculum includes the book as a reference. The book described the possibility of a "superstorm" reaching New York City; Hurricane Sandy occurred the week after the book's publication.

Englander gave a TEDx talk on sea level rise at TEDxBocaRaton in 2014 and later that year at Aquarium of the Bay in San Francisco; the latter lecture was covered by KQED. In 2019, he delivered a lecture at the Royal Institution. The talk, "Sea Level Rise Can No Longer Be Stopped, What Next?", is available on the Royal Institution's YouTube channel.

In 2020, Englander was interviewed by CBS News after coauthoring a publication stating that sea level rise was most likely exceeding projections.

The Science Bookshelf published Englander's second book, Moving to Higher Ground: Rising Sea Level and the Path Forward, in 2021. In an interview with KPCW, Englander said that sea levels were rising "ahead of schedule" and ice-melt was accelerating.

Englander has led expeditions to Greenland for the public to see firsthand the effects of climate change. Bret Stephens, a columnist for The New York Times who had previously been criticized for climate change denial, attended one such trip and wrote in 2022 that it "changed my mind about climate change". Englander also starred in the 2022 HBO Max series Brink of Disaster, in their episode about Miami.

As of 2026, Englander serves as the founding director of the Nova Southeastern University Rising Seas Institute and continues to lead expeditions to Greenland.
