= Judah Monis =

Judah Monis (February 4, 1683 – April 25, 1764) was North America's first college instructor of the Hebrew language, teaching at Harvard College from 1722 to 1760, and authored the first Hebrew textbook published in North America. Monis was also the first Jew to receive a college degree in the American colonies. His conversion to Christianity made him a figure of some controversy to both Jews and Christians.

== Early life ==
Monis was born into a family of former Portuguese conversos in Italy or the Barbary States, and was educated at Jewish academies in Livorno, Italy and Amsterdam. In Amsterdam, in the year 1707, he married Hana, daughter of Isaac Baruch-Rosa, and they had a baby boy, Isaac, who died after a few months. Approximately a year after that, his wife Hana died and Judah was now alone. During the year 1715, he left for New York, USA. Records show that Monis read for Jewish congregations in Jamaica and New York, and in roughly 1715, opened a small store in New York City, where he also began a second career teaching Hebrew to Jews and Christians, as well as a pastime of conducting discussions of theological topics, such as Kabbalah and the Holy Trinity, with leading Christian authorities. On February 28 of the following year, Monis was declared a freeman of the city. Around 1720, he left the established Jewish community of New York and moved to Cambridge, Massachusetts, where very few Jews lived at the time. At Harvard, he owned two slaves, a man named Cuffy and a woman named Cicely.

== At Harvard ==
At Harvard College, Monis received his Master of Arts in 1720, marking the first time a Jew had received a college degree in the American colonies and to receive an Honorary degree. As part of his graduation, Monis wrote a Hebrew grammar, entitled A Grammar of the Hebrew Tongue, and in 1720 submitted a handwritten copy to the Harvard Corporation for its "judicious perusal."

According to the general assumption that a scholar should be able to study the Bible in its original languages, all upperclassmen at Harvard were required to study Hebrew. A similar policy was to be instituted at Yale by Ezra Stiles later in the century. This was regarded as a difficult and unpleasant course, one reason for this being that there was no textbook available. On April 30, 1722, the corporation voted "That Mr. Judah Monis be approved instructor of the Hebrew Language," the first such position in America. He was also granted a salary of 50 pounds a year for two years. However, at that time, Harvard required all faculty to be professing Christians, and so Monis, the descendant of conversos, converted to Christianity a month before beginning his Harvard career. He was baptized in private in Harvard's College Hall and later in public. After the second baptism, Monis gave a speech in which he proved that Jesus Christ was the Messiah.

=== Career and controversies ===
This conversion was widely criticized by both the Jewish and Christian communities; Jews expressed anger and sorrow, while Christians questioned Monis' sincerity. Monis wrote three books defending the religious reasons behind his conversion, but Cambridge First Church records speculate disapprovingly on his secret observance of the Jewish Sabbath on Saturdays. Both Church and Harvard records frequently refer to Monis as "the converted Jew", "the converted rabbi", and "the Christianized Jew".

In 1723, Harvard stated that it was "greatly pleased with [Monis'] assiduity and faithfulness to his instruction", and raised his salary to 80 pounds per year, but in 1724, transferred the responsibility for undergraduate Hebrew teaching to other tutors, with Monis responsible only for teaching graduate students and the tutors. He married Abigail Marret in First Church, Cambridge, on January 18, 1724. Marret was the daughter of a Cambridge hardware store owner, and Monis had met her several years previously while Monis worked there.

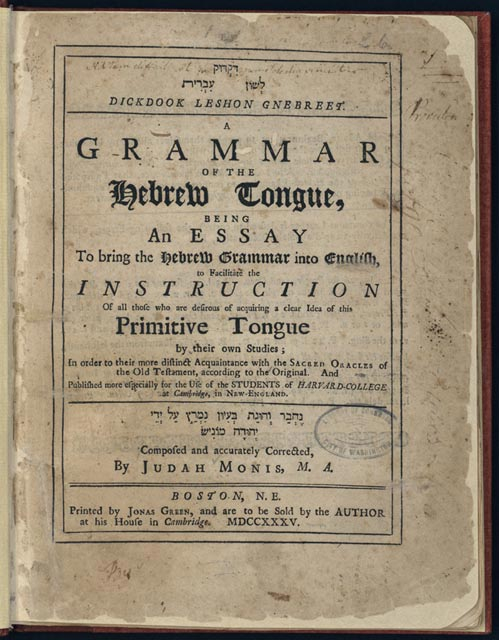
A Grammar of the Hebrew Tongue published in 1735. (Library of Congress)

Monis continued to use his handwritten grammar manual, but the unavailability of any Hebrew type for printing presses required that each student copy the entire text by hand, an unpopular job which took up to a month. Monis finally persuaded Harvard to import Hebrew type from London, and in 1735, with a loan from Harvard, Bostonian Jonas Green published a thousand copies of the textbook, the first Hebrew textbook printed in North America. Monis sold the books himself out of his Cambridge home, and it was a required text for all Harvard students for the ensuing 25 years. The American Jewish Historical Society possesses two copies of the printed books, as well as one of the handwritten copies.

His grammar book was poorly received and would be replaced in 1763 with A Hebrew Grammar, Collected Chiefly from Those of Mr. Israel Lyons, Teacher in the University of Cambridge. Monis would leave most of his other manuscripts translating English-language texts into Hebrew unpublished, given the difficulties with printing in Hebrew.

== Late life ==
Monis' duties at Harvard continued to diminish, until by 1760 he was teaching only one class per week, at which point he retired, citing his declining health. His wife Abigail had also died that same year before his retirement. He died four years later in Cambridge and is buried in a churchyard in Northborough, Massachusetts, under a tombstone bearing the image of a grafted tree to symbolize his conversion, with an inscription reading in part:

"A native branch of Jacob see.
Which once from off its olive brook
Regrafted, from the living tree."
