= Iver Elieson =

Norwegian businessman, landowner and timber merchant

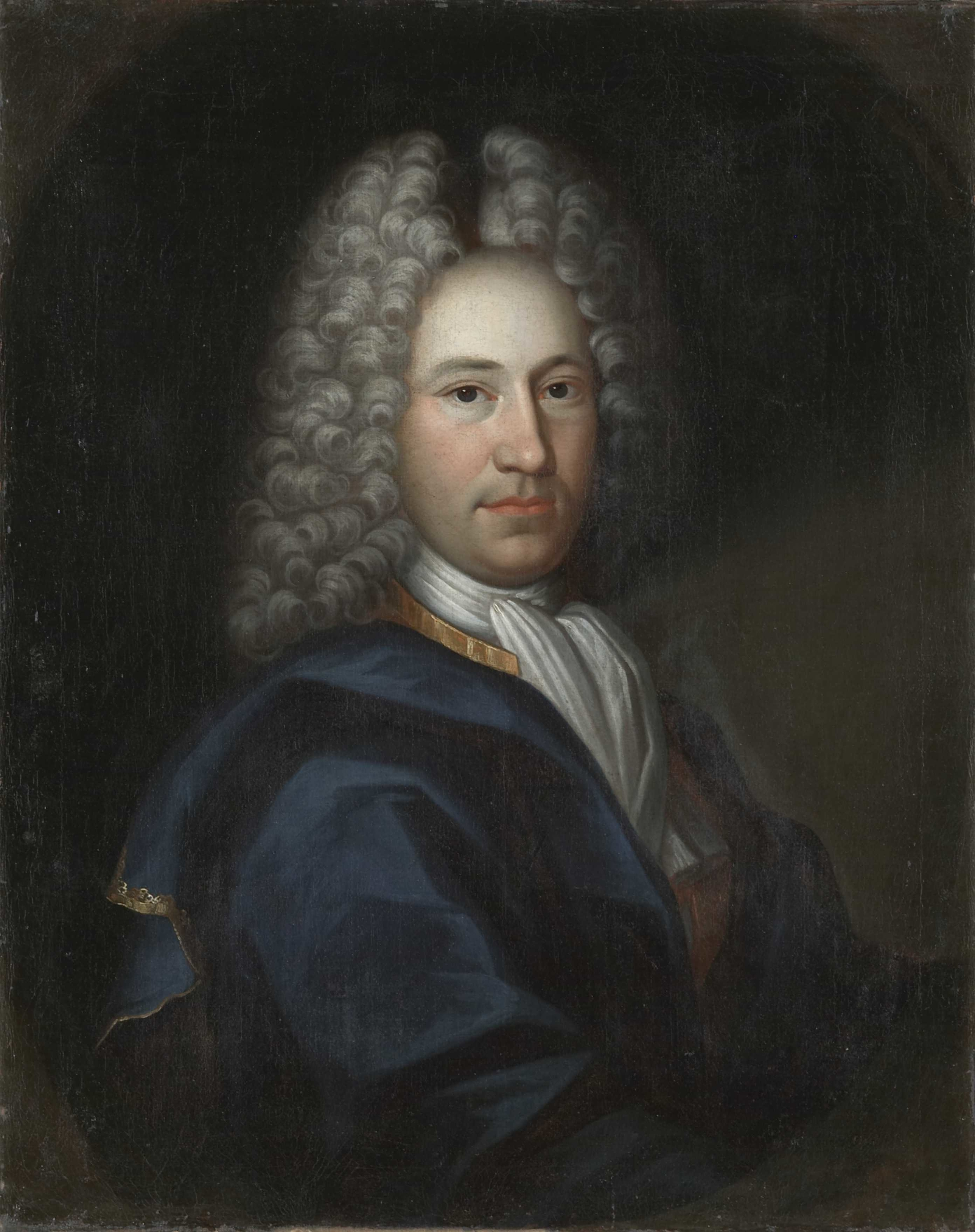
Portrett av Iver Elieson - Oslo Museum - OB.00124

Iver Elieson (3 November 1683 – 4 November 1753) was a Norwegian businessman, land owner and timber merchant.

Elieson was born at Drammen in Buskerud, Norway. His father, Elias Nielssøn (1654-1699), was a merchant in Bragernes. Dating from the 1720s, Elieson started buying forests and farms in Akershus. Eventually he developed into a large sawmill owner and timber exporter. He also owned a paper mill by the Akerselva. He had success with his timber trade and was among the wealthiest persons in Christiania (now Oslo).

== Personal life ==
He was married to Karen Mortensdatter Leuch (1694–1765). The couple had ten children. Their son, Morten Leuch Elieson (1724-1763) owned Hafslund Manor in Sarpsborg. Their daughter, Karen Elieson (1723-1806), was married to Christian Ancher who owned Paléet Manor near Bjørvika.
