= Lydia Lancaster =

British Quaker (1683–1761)

- Born: 8 March 1683; Lancashire
- Died: 30 May 1761 (aged 78); Lancaster
- Known for: Quaker ministry
- Spouse: Bryan Lancaster

Lydia Lancaster born Lydia Rawlinson (8 March 1683 – 30 May 1761) was a British Quaker minister who travelled around England and she visited Ireland and America. She corresponded and she was said to have been influential and a powerful speaker.

== Life ==
Lancaster was born in Graithwaite on the north border of Lancashire a few miles from Lake Windermere. She was the penultimate child of eight children born to Dorothy and Thomas Rawlinson. Her father died in 1689. She said she was always religious and at the age of 24 she became a minister. Lancaster said that she had resisted this calling, which she had first had, when she was fourteen. She married Bryan Lancaster in 1707 and he must have been a Quaker as it was forbidden to marry outside the faith. Lancaster had money problems and she commented later that she liked to be alone and that no one cared for her home when she was travelling.

She started travelling locally within a few years and she was visiting London and in 1712 she took a ferry to Ireland. In 1717 she had travelled north to Scotland. In 1718, Elizabeth Beck Rawlinson, Thomas Chalkley and Lydia went to America. Elizabeth was her sister in law, married to her brother Abraham. Chalkley was English but he had his own ship and he had moved to Philadelphia in 1701 where he continued to tour and speak.

In 1729 she and her mother moved to Colthouse. Her mother died in 1738 and in 1743 she was still in Colthouse with her husband. She supported women's meetings and hoped that this would be done nationally but this did not happen in her lifetime. Her husband, Bryan, died in 1747. Lancaster continued to travel and in the year before she died she was in Wales, London, Bristol and Bath.

== Death and legacy ==
Lancaster died back in Lancaster in 1761 and she was buried in a Quaker burial ground. She corresponded and she was said to have been influential and a powerful speaker. In 1840, Lydia Ann Barclay published a memoir and edited letters of her ancestor, Lydia Lancaster.
