= Georg Friedrich Christian Seekatz =

German painter (1683–1750)

Georg Friedrich Christian Seekatz (5 December 1683 – 22 December 1750) was a German painter of the Baroque period. He was the court painter of Nassau-Weilburg under Johann Ernst, Count of Nassau-Weilburg from 1706 until his death in 1750.

== Life ==
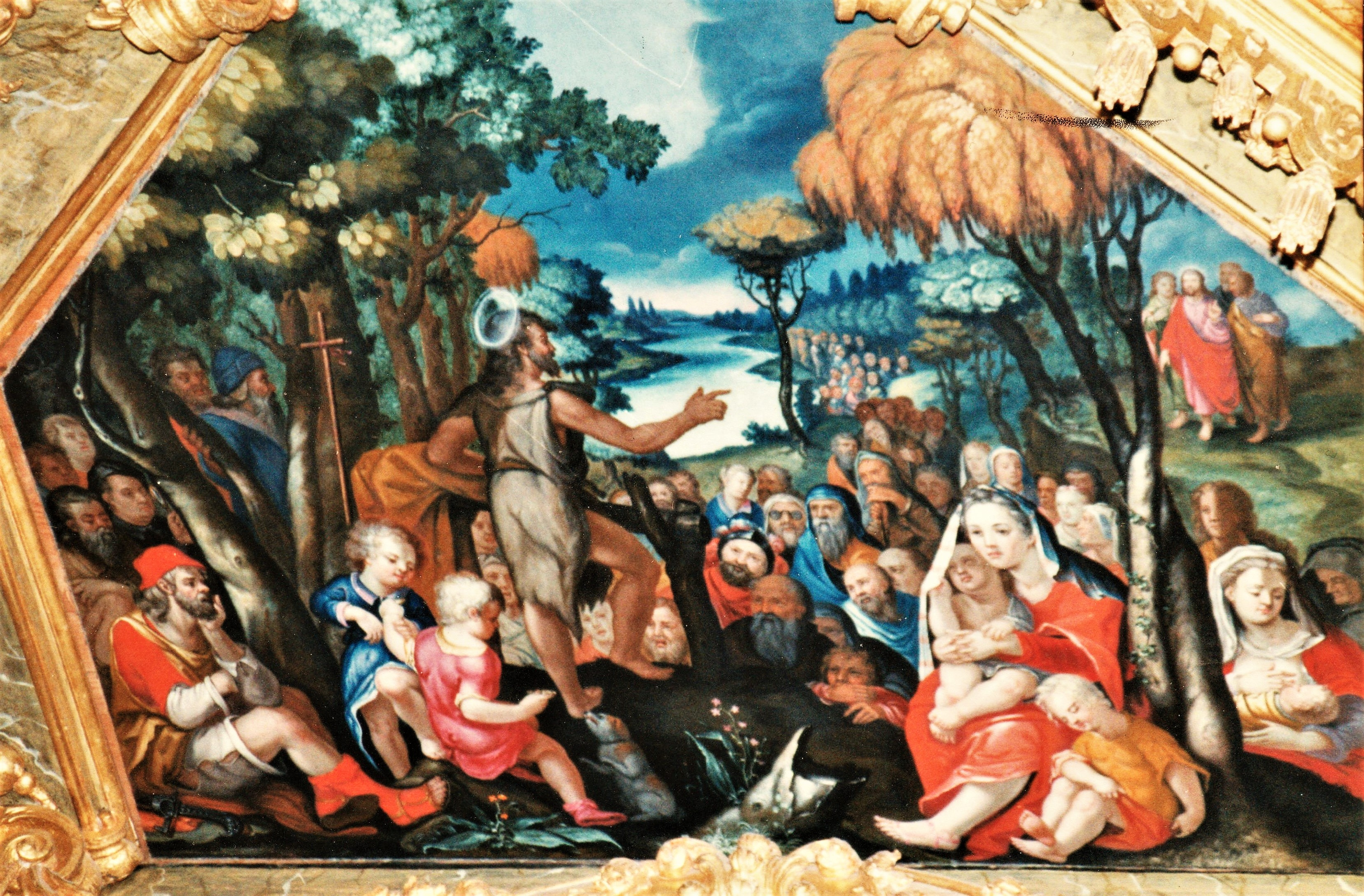
Painting in the Schloss Weilburg church by Seekatz

Georg Friedrich Christian Seekatz was born in Westerburg on 5 December 1683. His father, Johann George, was an innkeeper from the Seekatz family of painters. Georg Friedrich Christian was the third of fourth children; his older brother was the painter Johann Martin Seekatz.

In 1706, Seekatz became the court painter of Johann Ernst, Count of Nassau-Weilburg. He completed much of his major work at Schloss Weilburg, the count's residence in Weilburg. He painted the inside of the newly-built areas of the castle as well as the castle's church.

Seekatz married Maria Christiana Schmitt on 4 October 1712, with whom he had two children. Both children died in infancy.

Seekatz died on 22 December 1750 in Weilburg, aged 67. He remained active as the Weilburg court painter until his death.
