= Anna Maria Thelott =

Swedish artist (1683–1710)

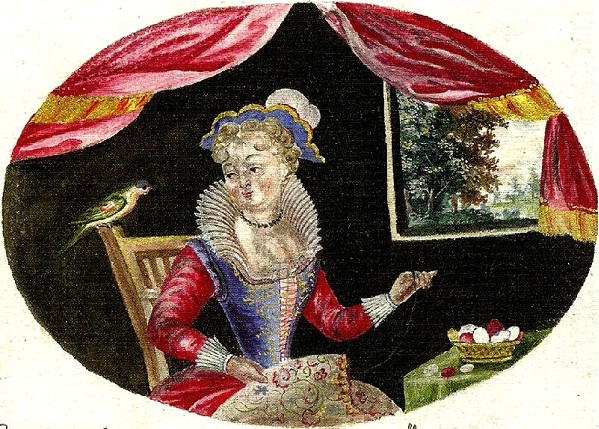
- Slightly damaged self-portrait oil painting depicting Anna Maria Thelott
- Born: 1683; Uppsala
- Died: 1710; Adolf Fredriks parish
- Occupation: Painter
- Father: Philip Jacob Thelott
- Relatives: Hans Philip Thelott, Philip Jacob Thelott, Olof Thelott

Anna Maria Thelott (1683–1710) was a Swedish artist. She was an engraver, an illustrator, a woodcut-artist, and a miniaturist painter.

== Biography ==
Anna Maria Thelott was born in Uppsala, Sweden. She was the daughter of engraver and watchmaker Philip Jacob Thelott the Elder (1635–1710), She was the sister of academic Philip Jacob Thelott the Younger (1682–1750) and half-sister of the engraver Olof Thelott (ca 1670–1728). Her parents had emigrated from Switzerland to Uppsala in the 1670s. She and her brothers were educated by her father in his trade, and active as the assistants in his studio as children. They were all assigned to assist him when he was commissioned by Olof Rudbeck (1630–1702) to illustrate his four volumes work Atlantica (Atland eller Manheim) and Campus Elysii.

She also accepted individual commissions early own to contribute to the support of the family. She performed commissions of illustrations by method of drawing, chalcography, copper engraving, India ink and woodcut. Among her many commissions were woodcut for the paper Posttidningen, chalcography for prayer books and, in collaboration with her brother Philip, India ink for the illustration of weapons. She made eleven woodcuts of German cities with texts for the paper Posttidningen in 1706. She was also frequently illustrated the work of Johan Peringskiöld (1654–1720). Her motif include animals, landscapes, allegory, maps and religious motives. She signed her work "Anna Marija ein geborene Thelotten".

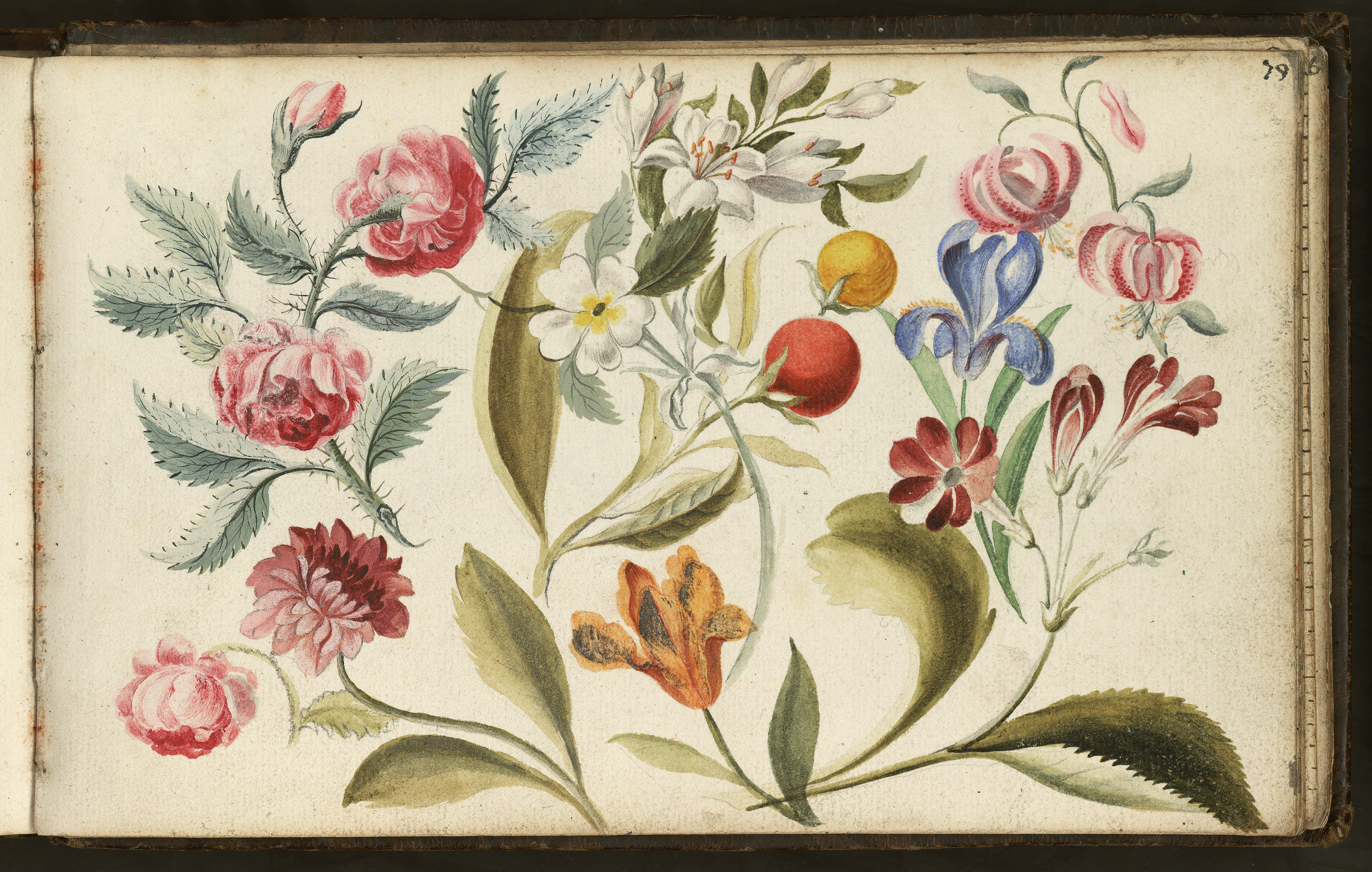
Watercolour by Thelott

After the great fire of Uppsala in 1702, the family moved to Stockholm. Her father lived in her household rather than that of her brothers, and she supported him when he could no longer work. In 1710, Anna Maria Thelott became one of the many victims of the 1710–1713 plague of Sweden, and died in Stockholm at the age of twenty-seven. She left a sketch book composed in 1704–1709, which is preserved at the University of Uppsala.

== Other sources ==
- Österberg, Carin et al., Svenska kvinnor: föregångare, nyskapare. Lund: Signum 1990. (ISBN 91-87896-03-6)
- Nordisk familjebok / Uggleupplagan. 28. Syrten-vikarna - Tidsbestämning /
- En mamsell i akademien. Ulrica Fredrica Pasch och 1700-talets konstvärld. av Anna Lena Lindberg, Stockholm: Signum, 2010. ISBN 978-91-86221-05-8
