= François Nicole =

French mathematician

François Nicole (23 December 1683 – 18 January 1758) was a French mathematician, born in Paris and died there, who published his Traité du calcul des différences finies in 1717; it contains rules both for forming differences and for effecting the summation of series. In 1706, he wrote a work on roulettes, particularly spherical epicycloids. In 1729 and 1731, he published memoirs on Newton's essay on curves of the third degree.
