= Joan Salvador i Riera =

Spanish naturalist, pharmacist, and botanist (1683–1726)

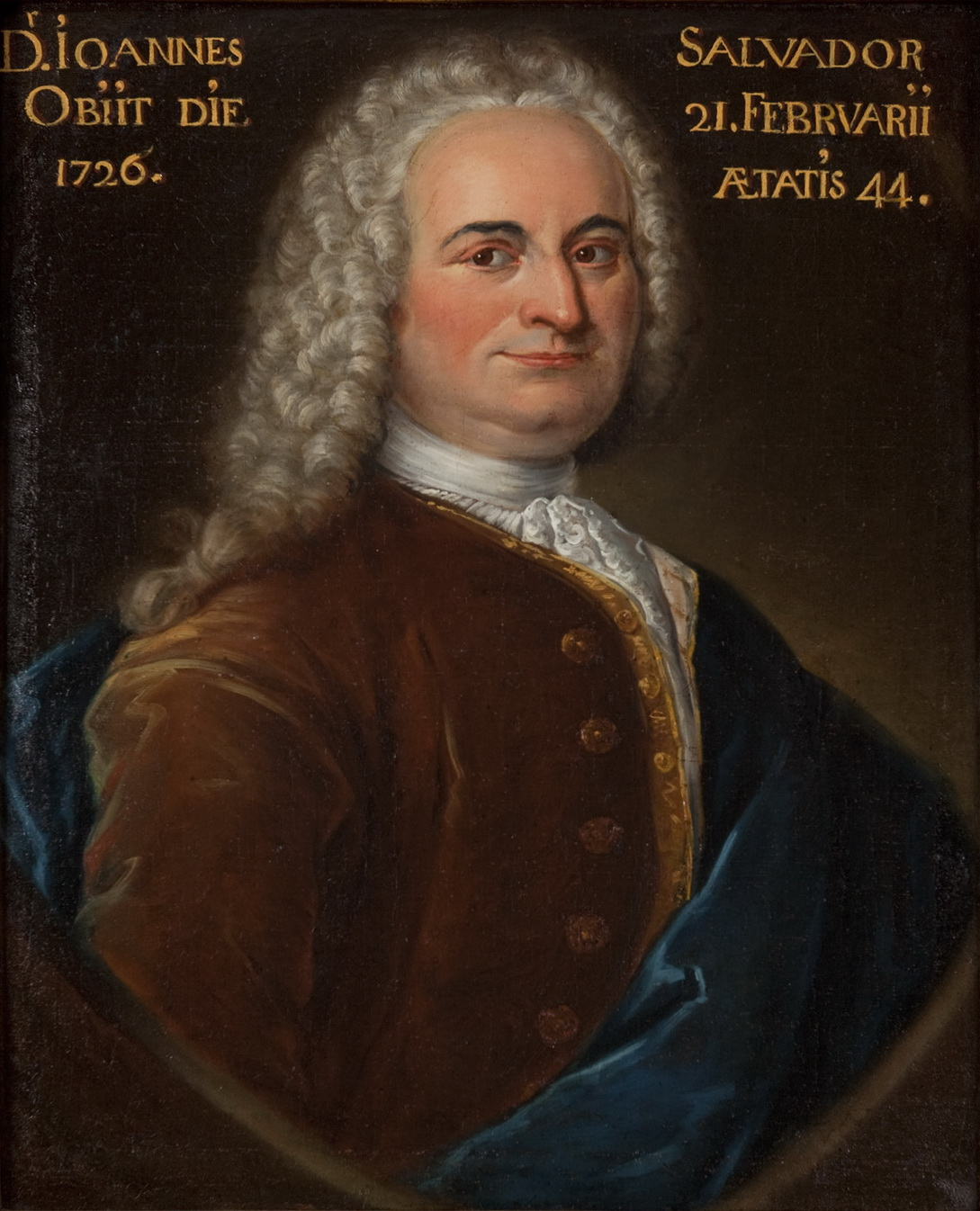
- Born: 1 December 1683; Barcelona, Spain
- Died: 21 February 1726 (aged 42)
- Education: Estudio General de Barcelona and Colegio de Boticarios barcelonés
- Scientific career
- Fields: Botanist, naturalist
- Patrons: Jaume Salvador i Pedrol, Pierre Magnol and J. Pitton de Tournefort

Joan Salvador i Riera (1 December 1683 – 21 February 1726) was a pharmacist and naturalist born in Barcelona, Spain.

He was the oldest son of Jaume Salvador i Pedrol, who was also an apothecary and naturalist. His grandfather was a famous naturalist, Joan Salvador i Boscà. He graduated with a Master of Arts from the Estudi General de Barcelona in 1700, and was admitted to the Barcelona Apothecary School in 1702. Salvador studied botany with Peire Magnol in Montpellier, and with his father's friend Joseph Pitton de Tournefort in Paris. In the fall of 1706, he returned to Barcelona from a trip to Occitania and Italy. At that time, the city was under the rule of Charles III.

Salvador was the main contributor to the oldest plant collection known in Spain, at the Botanic Institute of Barcelona.

Salvador wrote a memoir ON arts, fishing gear, and marine species, commissioned by the Royal Academy of Sciences in Paris and published in 1722.
