= Sapir (journal) =

Jewish quarterly journal

SAPIR
- Editor: Bret Stephens
- Categories: Jewish affairs and identity
- Frequency: Quarterly
- Founded: 2021
- First issue: Spring 2021
- Company: Maimonides Fund
- Country: United States
- Language: English
- Website: www.sapirjournal.org
- ISSN: 2767-1720

SAPIR is a quarterly political magazine focused on cultural, political, and social issues related to the Jewish community, with a focus on American Jews. The magazine publishes invited long-form think-pieces on a theme of interest to the Jewish community.

SAPIR is published by Maimonides Fund, and its editor-in-chief is The New York Times columnist Bret Stephens. SAPIR publicly launched in March 2021 and released its first issue in April.

== History ==
Stephens launched SAPIR in March 2021, with the initial issue focused on the intersection between social justice and American Jewry. SAPIR's launch was amidst a rise, between 2021 and 2023, of magazines across the ideological spectrum related to the Jewish experience.

On April 1, 2023, the Maimonides Fund launched the SAPIR Institute, an in-house organ to turn the ideas generated by the magazine into future plans of action. The institute is led by Chanan Weissman, former White House Jewish Liaison for the Obama and Biden Administrations.

In May 2025, the journal launched SAPIR debates. The first debate was between politicians Jason Greenblatt and Rahm Emanuel regarding whether or not US President Donald Trump was "good for the Jews" and was hosted at the 92nd Street Y. It was moderated by Stephens.

== See also ==
- Commentary
