= History of the Quakers =

The Religious Society of Friends began as a proto-evangelical Christian movement in England in the mid-17th century in Ulverston. Members are informally known as Quakers, as they were said "to tremble in the way of the Lord". The Quakers, especially the Valiant Sixty, sought to convert others by travelling through Britain and overseas preaching the Gospel. They based their message on a belief that "Christ has come to teach his people himself", stressing direct relations with God through Jesus Christ and belief in the universal priesthood of all believers. This personal religious experience of Christ was acquired by direct experience and by reading and studying the Bible.

Quakerism was influenced by the English Dissenters and Legatine-Arians of the English Civil War period, as well as the Radical Reformation and, to some extent, Behmenism. Quakerism emerged as a denomination of Protestant Christianity, and at present, Quakers predominantly identify as evangelical, though not all modern Quakers identify as Christian. Despite this diversity, the core values of peace, simplicity, and social justice continue to shape the Quaker identity. The movement in its early days faced strong opposition and persecution, but it continued to expand across the British Isles, the Americas and Africa. The Quakers, though few in numbers, have been continuously influential in the history of reform. The colony of Pennsylvania was founded by William Penn in 1682, as a safe place for Quakers to live and practice their faith. Quakers have been a significant part of the movements for the abolition of slavery, to promote equal rights for women, and peace. They have also promoted education and the humane treatment of prisoners and the mentally ill, through the founding or reforming of various institutions. Quaker entrepreneurs played a central role in forging the Industrial Revolution, especially in England and Pennsylvania.

During the 19th century, Friends in the United States suffered a number of secessions, which resulted in the formation of different branches of the Religious Society of Friends.

== Historical context ==
The Kingdom of England had struggled religiously for centuries since the Norman Invasion, grappling with doctrines such as Papal supremacy. In the 1300s, the proto-Protestant movement known as Lollardy arose, calling for radical reforms of the medieval church. Parallels between the Lollards and Quakers and related groups have been drawn for a long time. During the Peasants' Revolt of 1381, the priest John Ball advocated radical, egalitarian reorganization of society. Whilst the extent of overlap between John Wycliffe's disciples and subsequent movements is debated, Lollard ideas would lay inspiration in the religious culture of England; for example, Quakerism was strongest in parishes in Essex where Lollardy had previously taken root.

== George Fox and the Religious Society of Friends ==
When George Fox was eleven, he wrote that God spoke to him about "keeping pure and being faithful to God and man." After being troubled when his friends asked him to drink alcohol with them at the age of nineteen, Fox spent the night in prayer and soon afterwards, he left his home to search for spiritual satisfaction, which lasted four years. In his Journal, at age 23, he recorded the words:

And when all my hopes in them and in all men were gone, so that I had nothing outwardly, to help me, nor could tell what to do; then, O then, I heard a voice which said 'There is one, even Christ Jesus, that can speak to thy condition.' When I heard it, my heart did leap for joy. Then the Lord let me see why there was none upon the earth that could speak to my condition, namely, that I might give him all the glory. For all are concluded under sin, and shut up in unbelief, as I had been, that Jesus Christ might have the pre-eminence, who enlightens, and gives grace, faith, and power. Thus when God doth work, who shall let (hinder) it?

At this time, Fox believed that he "found through faith in Jesus Christ the full assurance of salvation." Fox began to spread his evangelical Christian message and his emphasis on "the necessity of an inward transformation of heart", as well as the possibility of Christian perfection, drew opposition from English clergy and laity. Fox wrote that "The professors [professing Christians] were in a rage, all pleading for sin and imperfection, and could not endure to hear talk of perfection, or of a holy and sinless life." However, in the mid-1600s, many people became attracted to Fox's preaching and his followers became known as Friends. By 1660, the Quakers grew to 35,000. Well known early advocates of Quaker Christianity included Isaac Penington, Robert Barclay, Thomas Ellwood, William Penn and Margaret Fell.

Quakerism pulled together groups of disparate Seekers that formed the Religious Society of Friends following 1647. This time of upheaval and social and political unrest called all institutions into question, so George Fox and his leading disciples - James Nayler, Richard Hubberthorne, Margaret Fell, as well as numerous others - targeted "scattered Baptists", disillusioned soldiers, and restless common folk as potential Quakers. Confrontations with the established churches and its leaders and those who held power at the local level assured those who spoke for the new sect a ready hearing as they insisted that God could speak to average people, through his risen son, without the need to heed churchmen, pay tithes, or engage in deceitful practices. They found fertile ground in northern England in 1651 and 1652, building a base there from which they moved south, first to London and then beyond. In the early days the groups remained scattered, but gradually they consolidated in the north - the first meeting being created in Durham in 1653 - to provide financial support to the missionaries who had gone south and presently abroad. Before long they seemed a potential threat to the dignity of the Cromwellian state. Even arresting its leaders failed to slow the movement, instead giving them a new audience in the courts of the nation.

== Nayler's sign ==
In 1656, a popular Quaker minister, James Nayler, went beyond the standard beliefs of Quakers when he rode into Bristol on a horse in the pouring rain, accompanied by a handful of men and women saying "Holy, holy, holy" and strewing their garments on the ground, imitating Jesus's entry into Jerusalem. While this was apparently an attempt to emphasize that the "Light of Christ" was in every person, most observers believed that he and his followers believed Nayler to be Jesus Christ. The participants were arrested by the authorities and handed over to Parliament, where they were tried. Parliament was sufficiently incensed by Nayler's heterodox views that they punished him savagely and sent him back to Bristol to jail indefinitely. This was especially bad for the movement's respectability in the eyes of the Puritan rulers because some considered Nayler (and not Fox, who was in jail at the time) to be the actual leader of the movement. Many historians see this event as a turning point in early Quaker history because many other leaders, especially Fox, made efforts to increase the authority of the group, so as to prevent similar behaviour. This effort culminated in 1666 with the "Testimony from the Brethren", aimed at those who, in its own words, despised a rule "without which we ... cannot be kept holy and inviolable"; it continued the centralizing process that began with the Nayler affair and was aimed at isolating any separatists who still lurked in the Society. Fox also established women's meetings for discipline and gave them an important role in overseeing marriages, which served both to isolate the opposition and fuel discontent with the new departures. In the 1660s and 1670s Fox himself travelled the country setting up a more formal structure of monthly (local) and quarterly (regional) meetings, a structure that is still used today.

== Other early controversies ==
The Society was rent by controversy in the 1660s and 1670s because of these tendencies. First, John Perrot, previously a respected minister and missionary, raised questions about whether men should uncover their heads when another Friend prayed in meeting. He also opposed a fixed schedule for meetings for worship. Soon this minor question broadened into an attack on the power of those at the centre. Later, during the 1670s, William Rogers of Bristol and a group from Lancashire, whose spokesmen John Story and John Wilkinson were both respected leaders, led a schism. They disagreed with the heightening influence of women and centralizing authority among Friends closer to London. In 1666, a group of about a dozen leaders, led by Richard Farnworth (Fox was absent, being in prison in Scarborough), gathered in London and issued a document that they styled "A Testimony of the Brethren". It set rules to maintain the good order that they wanted to see among adherents and excluded separatists from holding office and prohibited them from travelling lest they sow errors. Looking to the future, they announced that authority in the Society rested with them.

== Women and equality ==
One of their most radical innovations was a more nearly equal role for women. Despite the survival of strong patriarchal elements, Friends believed in the spiritual equality of women, who were allowed to take a far more active role than had ordinarily existed before the emergence of radical civil war sects. Among many female Quaker writers and preachers of the 1650s to 1670s were Margaret Fell, Dorothy White, Hester Biddle, Sarah Blackborow, Rebecca Travers and Alice Curwen. Early Quaker defenses of their female members were sometimes equivocal, however, and after the Restoration of 1660 the Quakers became increasingly unwilling to publicly defend women when they adopted tactics such as disrupting services. Women's meetings were organized as a means to involve women in more modest, feminine pursuits. Writers such as Dorcas Dole and Elizabeth Stirredge turned to subjects seen as more feminine in that period. Some Quaker men sought to exclude them from church public concerns with which they had some powers and responsibilities, such as allocating poor relief and in ensuring that Quaker marriages could not be attacked as immoral. The Quakers continued to meet openly, even in the dangerous year of 1683. Heavy fines were exacted and, as in earlier years, women were treated as severely as men by the authorities.

== Persecution in England ==
In 1650, George Fox was imprisoned for the first time in Nottingham, and was repeatedly thrown in prison from the 1650s to the 1670s. Other Quakers followed him to prison as well, mostly for charges of causing a disturbance or blasphemy.

Two acts of Parliament made it particularly difficult for Friends. The first was the Quaker Act 1662 which made it illegal to refuse to take the Oath of Allegiance to the Crown. Those refusing to swear an oath of allegiance to the Crown were not allowed to hold any secret meetings and, because Friends believed it was wrong to take any "superstitious" oath, their freedom of religious expression was certainly compromised by this law. The second was the Conventicle Act 1664 which reaffirmed that the holding of any secret meeting by those who did not pledge allegiance to the Crown was a crime. Despite these laws, Friends continued to meet openly.

Under James II of England, persecution practically ceased. James issued a Declaration of Indulgence in 1687 and 1688, and it was widely held that William Penn had been its author.

== Quakers in the Netherlands ==
Quakers first arrived in the Netherlands in 1655 when William Ames and Margaret Fell's nephew, William Caton, took up residence in Amsterdam. William Penn, the Quaker founder of Pennsylvania, who had a Dutch mother, visited the Netherlands in 1671 and saw, first hand, the persecution of the Emden Quakers.

The attraction of a life free from persecution in the New World led to a gradual Dutch Quaker migration. English Quakers in Rotterdam were permitted to transport people and cargo by ship to English colonies without restriction and throughout the 18th century many Dutch Quakers emigrated to Pennsylvania. There were an estimated 500 Quaker families in Amsterdam in 1710 but by 1797 there were only seven Quakers left in the city. Isabella Maria Gouda (1745–1832), a granddaughter of Jan Claus, took care of the meeting house on Keizersgracht but when she stopped paying the rent the Yearly Meeting in London had her evicted. The Quaker presence disappeared from Dutch life by the early 1800s until reemerging in the 1920s, with Netherlands Yearly Meeting being established in 1931.

The Friends had no ordained ministers and thus needed no seminaries for theological training. As a result, they did not open any colleges in the colonial period, and did not join in founding the University of Pennsylvania. The major Quaker colleges were Haverford College (1833), Earlham College (1847), Swarthmore College (1864), and Bryn Mawr College (1885), all founded much later. The Friends did start the first elementary schools in Pennsylvania, Penn Charter (1689), Darby Friends School (1692) and Abington (1696).

== Persecution and acceptance in the New World ==
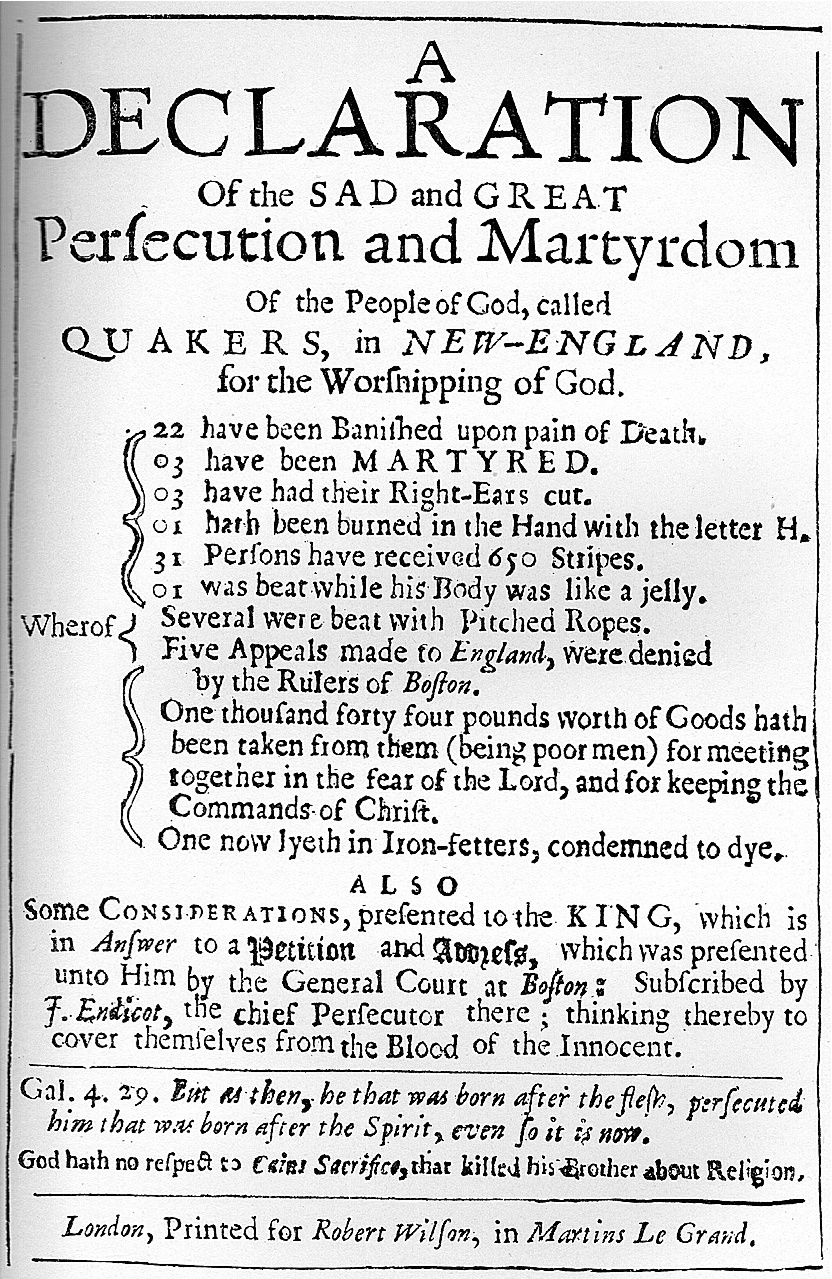
Title page of book on Quaker persecution in New England

In 1657 some Quakers were able to find refuge to practice in Providence Plantations established by Roger Williams. Other Quakers faced persecution in Puritan Massachusetts. In 1656 Mary Fisher and Ann Austin began preaching in Boston. They were considered heretics because of their insistence on individual obedience to the Inner Light. They were imprisoned and banished by the Massachusetts Bay Colony. Their books were burned, and most of their property was confiscated. They were imprisoned under terrible conditions, then deported.

Some Quakers in New England were only imprisoned or banished. A few were also whipped or branded. Christopher Holder and John Copeland for example, had their ears cut off. A few were executed by the Puritan leaders, usually for ignoring and defying orders of banishment. Mary Dyer was thus executed in 1660. Three other martyrs to the Quaker faith in Massachusetts were William Robinson, Marmaduke Stephenson, and William Leddra. These events are described by Edward Burrough in A Declaration of the Sad and Great Persecution and Martyrdom of the People of God, called Quakers, in New-England, for the Worshipping of God (1661). Around 1667, the English Quaker preachers Alice and Thomas Curwen, who had been busy in Rhode Island and New Jersey, were imprisoned in Boston under Massachusetts law and publicly flogged.

In 1657 a group of Quakers from England landed in New Amsterdam. One of them, Robert Hodgson, preached to large crowds of people. He was arrested, imprisoned, and flogged. Governor Peter Stuyvesant issued a harsh ordinance, punishable by fine and imprisonment, against anyone found guilty of harboring Quakers. Some sympathetic Dutch colonists were able to get him released. Almost immediately after the edict was released, Edward Hart, the town clerk in what is now Flushing, New York, gathered his fellow citizens on Dec. 27, 1657 and wrote a petition to Stuyvesant, called the Flushing Remonstrance, citing the Flushing town charter of 1645, which promised liberty of conscience. Stuyvesant arrested Hart and the other official who presented the document to him, and he jailed two other magistrates who had signed the petition, and also forced the other signatories to recant. But Quakers continued to meet in Flushing. Stuyvesant arrested a farmer, John Bowne, in 1662 for holding illegal meetings in his home and banished him from the colony; Bowne immediately went to Amsterdam to plead for the Quakers. Though the Dutch West India Company called Quakerism an "abominable religion", it nevertheless overruled Stuyvesant in 1663 and ordered him to "allow everyone to have his own belief".

=== Sandwich and Daniel Wing ===
In Bowden's History of the Society of Friends in America, it is mentioned that "two English Friends, named Christopher Holden and John Copeland came to Sandwich on the 20th of the 6th month" of 1657 and there they found friends of toleration and resisters of an oppressive law in Daniel Wing, the son of John Wing and Deborah Bachiler, and grandson of Stephen Bachiler. Daniel Wing and his brother Stephen Wing and others resisted an oppressive law in the town of Sandwich which publicly punished men and women by whipping, for "meetings at private houses, for encouraging others in holding meetings, for entertaining the preachers and for the unworthy speeches". By 1658, Daniel Wing, with others who acted with him, became active converts and there were 18 families who recorded their names in the documents of the society. Writers of 1658-1660 said "We have two strong places in this land, the one at Newport and the other at Sandwich; almost the whole town of Sandwich is adhering towards them" and the records of the Monthly Meetings of Friends show that the Sandwich Monthly Meeting was the first established in America.

=== William Penn and settlement in colonial Pennsylvania ===
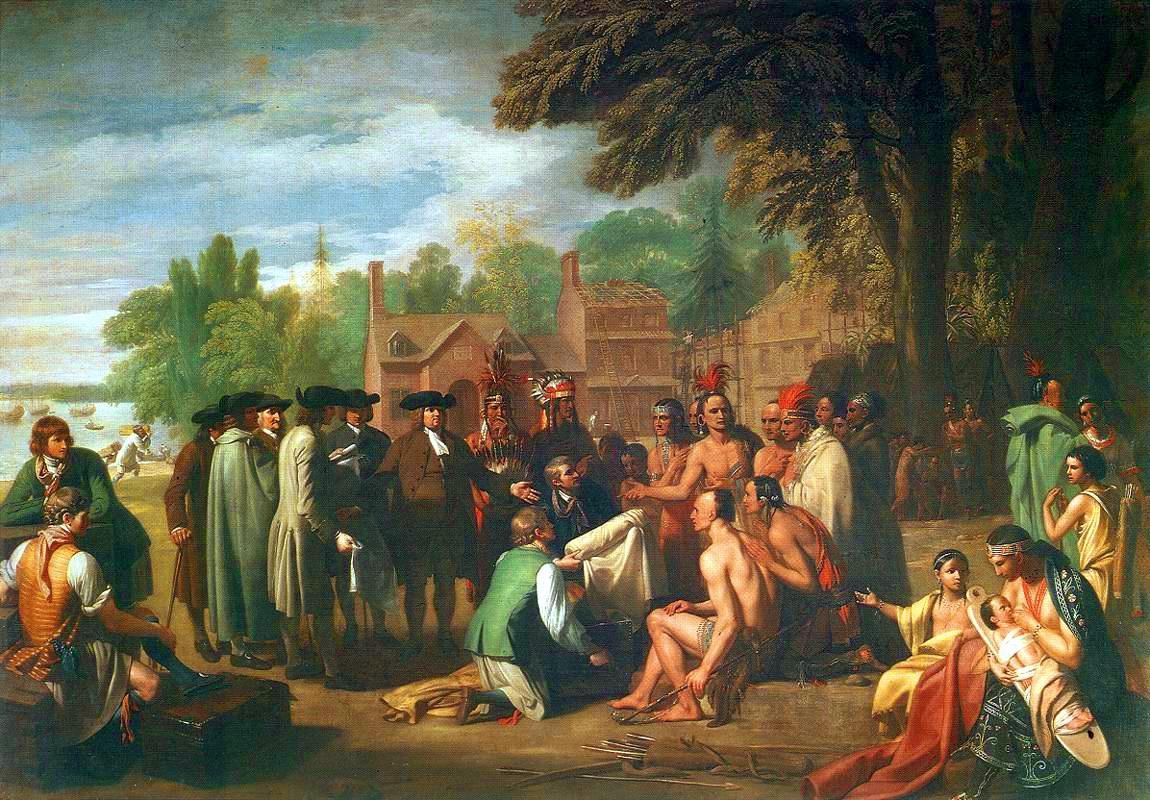
Penn's Treaty with the Indians

William Penn, a colonist to whom the king owed money, received ownership of Pennsylvania in 1681, which he tried to make a "holy experiment" by a union of temporal and spiritual matters. Pennsylvania made guarantees of religious freedom, and kept them, attracting many Quakers and others. Quakers took political control but were bitterly split on the funding of military operations or defenses; finally they relinquished political power. They created a second "holy experiment" by extensive involvement in voluntary benevolent associations while remaining apart from government. Programs of civic activism included building schools, hospitals and asylums for the entire city. Their new tone was an admonishing moralism born from a feeling of crisis. Even more extensive philanthropy was possible because of the wealth of the Quaker merchants based in Philadelphia.

The Quakers did not want to provide military troops to defend frontier settlements. They passed a bill that gave themselves the authority to appoint commissioners to oversee provincial Indian agents, interpreters, traders, and the legal means to build their own trade posts. In April 1756, a group of Philadelphia Quakers formed the Friendly Association for Regaining and Preserving Peace with the Indians by Pacific Measures. Its purpose was to fulfill the legacy of William Penn's "Holy Experiment", which included "preserving the Friendship of the Indians. The association provided funding for commissioners of Indian affairs helping the Quakers control Indian diplomacy and trade in Pennsylvania.

== Eighteenth century ==
In North America, Quakers, like other religious groups, were involved in the migration to the frontier. Initially this involved moves south from Pennsylvania and New Jersey along the Great Wagon Road. Historic meeting houses such as the 1759 Hopewell Friends Meeting House in Frederick County, Virginia and Lynchburg, Virginia's 1798 South River Friends Meetinghouse stand as testaments to the expanding borders of American Quakerism.

Most Quakers did not oppose owning slaves when they first came to North America. To most Quakers, "slavery was perfectly acceptable provided that slave owners attended to the spiritual and material needs of those they enslaved". Gradually, Quakers became more opposed to slavery. Quaker preacher John Woolman began speaking out against slavery, which he believed to be contrary to Christianity. By 1756 only 10% of leaders of Philadelphia Yearly Meeting owned slaves. In 1688, a group of Quakers along with some German Mennonites met at the meeting house in Germantown, Pennsylvania, to discuss why they were distancing themselves from slavery. Four of them signed a document written by Francis Daniel Pastorius that stated, "To bring men hither, or to rob and sell them against their will, we stand against." They asked "what thing in the world can be done worse towards us, than if men should rob or steal us away and sell us for slaves to strange countries"

From 1755 to 1776, the Quakers worked at freeing slaves, and became the first Western organization to ban slaveholding. They also created societies to promote the emancipation of slaves. From the efforts of the Quakers, Ben Franklin and Thomas Jefferson were able to convince the Continental Congress to ban the importation of slaves into America as of December 1, 1775. Pennsylvania was the strongest anti-slavery state at the time, and with Franklin's help they led "The Pennsylvania Society for Promoting The Abolition of Slavery, The Relief of Free Negroes Unlawfully Held in Bondage, and for Improving the Condition of the African Race" (Pennsylvania Abolition Society).

The Southern states, however, were still very prominent in keeping slavery running. Because of this, an informal network of safe houses and escape routes, called the Underground Railroad, developed across the United States to get enslaved people out of America and into British North America or the free states. The Quakers were a very prominent force in the Underground Railroad, and their efforts helped free many slaves. Educator Levi Coffin and his wife Catherine were Quakers who lived in Indiana and helped the Underground Railroad by hiding slaves in their house for over 21 years. They claimed to have helped 3,000 slaves gain their freedom.

A small breakaway group, the Religious Society of Free Quakers, originally called "The Religious Society of Friends, by some styled the Free Quakers", was established on February 20, 1781 in Philadelphia, Pennsylvania. More commonly known as Free Quakers, the Society was founded by Quakers who had been expelled for failure to adhere to the Peace Testimony during the American Revolution. Notable Free Quakers at the early meetings include Lydia Darragh and Betsy Ross. After 1783, the number of Free Quakers began to dwindle as some members died and others were either accepted back into the Society of Friends or by other religious institutions. The movement had died out by the 1830s.

== Nineteenth century ==
During the 19th century, Friends continued to influence the world around them. Many of the industrial concerns started by Friends in the previous century continued as detailed in Milligan's Biographical dictionary of British Quakers in commerce and industry, with new ones beginning. Friends also continued and increased their work in the areas of social justice and equality. They made other contributions as well in the fields of science, literature, art, law and politics.

Quakers continued to actively promote reforms and equal rights during the 19th century. Prison reform was a concern of Quakers at that time. Elizabeth Fry and her brother Joseph John Gurney campaigned for more humane treatment of prisoners and for the abolition of the death penalty. They played a key role in forming the Association for the Improvement of the Female Prisoners in Newgate, which managed to better the living conditions of woman and children held at the prison. Their work raised concerns about the prison system as a whole, so that they were a factor behind Parliament eventually passing legislation to improve conditions further and decrease the number of capital crimes.

In the early days of the Society of Friends, Quakers were not allowed to get an advanced education. Eventually some did get opportunities to go to university and beyond, which meant that more and more Quakers could enter the various fields of science. Thomas Young an English Quaker, did experiments with optics, contributing much to the wave theory of light. He also discovered how the lens in the eye works and described astigmatism and formulated an hypothesis about the perception of color. Young was also involved in translating the Rosetta Stone. He translated the demotic text and began the process of understanding the hieroglyphics. Maria Mitchell was an astronomer who discovered a comet. She was also active in the abolition movement and the women's suffrage movement. Joseph Lister promoted the use of sterile techniques in medicine, based on Pasteur's work on germs. Thomas Hodgkin was a pathologist who made major breakthroughs in the field of anatomy. He was the first doctor to describe the type of lymphoma named after him. An historian, he was also active in the movement to abolish slavery and to protect aboriginal people. John Dalton formulated the atomic theory of matter, among other scientific achievements.

At first Quakers were barred by law and their own convictions from being involved in the arena of law and politics. As time went on, a few Quakers in England and the United States did enter that arena. Joseph Pease was the son of Edward Pease mentioned above. He continued and expanded his father's business. In 1832 he became the first Quaker elected to Parliament. Noah Haynes Swayne was the only Quaker to serve on the United States Supreme Court. He was an Associate Justice from 1862 to 1881. He strongly opposed slavery, moving out of the slave-holding state of Virginia to the free state of Ohio in his young adult years.

=== Theological schisms ===
Quakers found that theological disagreements over doctrine and evangelism had left them divided into the Gurneyites, who questioned the applicability of early Quaker writings to the modern world, and the conservative Wilburites. Wilburites not only held to the writings of Fox (1624–91) and other early Friends, they actively sought to bring not only Gurneyites, but Hicksites, who had split off during the 1820s over antislavery and theological issues, back to orthodox Quaker belief. Apart from theology there were social and psychological patterns revealed by the divisions. The main groups were the growth-minded Gurneyites, Orthodox Wilburites, and reformist Hicksites. Their differences increased after the American Civil War (1861–65), leading to more splintering. The Gurneyites became more evangelical, embraced Methodist-like revivalism and the Holiness Movement, and became probably the leading force in American Quakerism. They formally endorsed such radical innovations as the pastoral system. Neither the Hicksites nor Wilburites experienced such numerical growth. The Hicksites became more liberal and declined in number, while the Wilburites remained both orthodox and divided.

The Society in Ireland, and later the United States, suffered a number of schisms during the 19th century. In 1827–28, the views and popularity of Elias Hicks resulted in a division within five-yearly meetings, Philadelphia, New York, Ohio, Indiana, and Baltimore. Rural Friends, who had increasingly chafed under the control of urban leaders, sided with Hicks and naturally took a stand against strong discipline in doctrinal questions. Those who supported Hicks were tagged as "Hicksites", while Friends who opposed him were labeled "Orthodox". The latter had more adherents overall, but were plagued by subsequent splintering. The only division the Hicksites experienced was when a small group of upper-class and reform-minded Progressive Friends of Longwood, Pennsylvania, emerged in the 1840s; they maintained a precarious position for about a century.

In the early 1840s the Orthodox Friends in America were exercised by a transatlantic dispute between Joseph John Gurney of England and John Wilbur of Rhode Island. Gurney, troubled by the example of the Hicksite separation, emphasized Scriptural authority and favored working closely with other Christian groups. Wilbur, in response, defended the authority of the Holy Spirit as primary, and worked to prevent the dilution of the Friends tradition of Spirit-led ministry. After privately criticizing Gurney in correspondence to sympathetic Friends, Wilbur was expelled from his yearly meeting in a questionable proceeding in 1842. Probably the best known Orthodox Friend was the poet and abolitionist editor John Greenleaf Whittier. Over the next several decades, a number of Wilburite–Gurneyite separations occurred. Starting in the late 19th century, many American Gurneyite Quakers, led by Dougan Clark Jr., adopted the use of paid pastors, planned sermons, revivals, hymns and other elements of Protestant worship services. They left behind the old "plain style".

For the most part, Friends in Britain were strongly evangelical in doctrine and escaped these major separations, though they corresponded only with the Orthodox and mostly ignored the Hicksites.

=== Native Americans ===
The Quakers were involved in many of the great reform movements of the first half of the 19th century. After the Civil War they won over President Grant to their ideals of a just policy toward the American Indians, and became deeply involved in Grant's "Peace Policy". Quakers were motivated by high ideals, played down the role of conversion to Christianity, and worked well side by side with the Indians. They had been highly organized and motivated by the anti-slavery crusade, and after the Civil War were poised to expand their energies to include both ex-slaves and the western tribes. They had Grant's ear and became the principal instruments for his peace policy. During 1869–85, they served as appointed agents on numerous reservations and superintendencies in a mission centered on moral uplift and manual training. Their ultimate goal of acculturating the Indians to American culture was not reached because of frontier land hunger and Congressional patronage politics.

== Twentieth century ==
World War I at first produced an effort toward unity, embodied in the creation of the American Friends Service Committee in 1917 by Orthodox Friends, led by Rufus Jones and Henry Cadbury. A Friends Service Committee, as an agency of London Yearly Meeting, had already been created in Britain to help Quakers deal with military service problems; it continues today, after numerous name changes, as Quaker Peace & Social Witness. Envisioned as a service outlet for conscientious objectors that could draw support from across diverse yearly meetings, the AFSC began losing support from more evangelical Quakers as early as the 1920s and served to emphasize the differences between them, but prominent Friends such as Herbert Hoover continued to offer it their public support. Many Quakers from Oregon, Ohio, and Kansas became alienated from the Five Years Meeting (later the Friends United Meeting), considering it infected with the kind of theological liberalism that Jones exemplified; Oregon Yearly Meeting withdrew in 1927.

In 1938–1939, just prior to the outbreak of the Second World War, 10,000 European Jewish children were given temporary resident visas for the UK, in what became known as the Kindertransport. This allowed these children to escape the Holocaust. American Quakers played a major role in pressuring the British government to supply these visas. The Quakers chaperoned the Jewish children on the trains, and cared for many of them once they arrived in Britain. Quakers were nominated five times, starting from 1912, by the Nobel Peace Prize Committee for "...their pioneering work in the international peace movement and compassionate effort to relieve human suffering."

During the 20th century, two Quakers became presidents of the United States, namely Herbert Hoover and Richard Nixon. In the UK, Philip Noel-Baker, was a Labour representative in Parliament from 1929 to 1982. He was also awarded a Nobel Peace Prize. The Quakers' global body, Friends World Committee for Consultation, has consultative status at the United Nations; two Quaker United Nations Offices are based in New York and Geneva. Beginning in 1955 and continuing for a decade, three of the yearly meetings divided by the Hicksite separation of 1827, Philadelphia, Baltimore, and New York, as well as Canadian Yearly Meeting, reunited.

Quakers in Costa Rica first arrived in the 1950s. A group of American Quakers fled the United States as conscientious objectors to the draft. The Quakers moved to Costa Rica, which they chose due to Article 12 of the Constitution, which abolished the country's army in 1949. They purchased land in the mountains of the Puntarenas Province and founded the city of Monteverde for dairy farming. Quakers have had a large lasting impact on Costa Rica's environmental policies as well as its dairy and ecotourism industries. Monteverde is now a major ecotourism hub renowned for its environmental protections.

== See also ==
- List of Quakers
