= Quakers in Costa Rica =

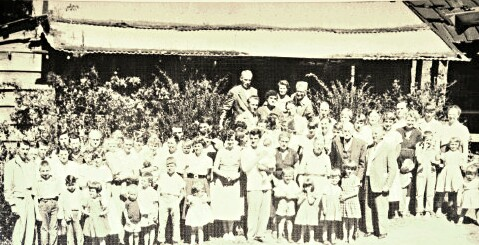
Quakers in Monteverde, 1950s

Quakers (members of the Religious Society of Friends) have had a presence in Costa Rica since the 1950s. A group of American Quakers fled the United States as conscientious objectors to the draft. The Quakers moved to Costa Rica, which they chose due to Article 12 of the Constitution, which abolished the country's army in 1949. They purchased land in the mountains of the Puntarenas Province and founded the city of Monteverde for dairy farming.

Quakers continue to live in Monteverde, and they have had a large lasting impact on Costa Rica's environmental policies as well as its dairy and ecotourism industries. Monteverde is now a major ecotourism hub renowned for its environmental protections.

== History ==
=== United States origins ===
In 1948, the United States implemented the Military Selective Service Act, which authorized the implementation of military conscription. Also in 1948, Costa Rica abolished its army after the end of the Costa Rican Civil War. The abolition of the Costa Rican army was officially added to the nation's constitution in 1949 through Article 12.

In response to the implementation of the draft in the United States, Marvin Rockwell and three other Quakers from Fairhope, Alabama, wrote letters to the draft board declaring that they would not cooperate because it violated their religious values. They were arrested, tried, and sentenced to prison for one year and one day. The sentencing judge told one of the Quakers to either register for the draft or move to another country.

As they served their prison sentences, other Quakers in Fairhope debated the morality of living in the United States, which used their taxes to fund wars. During this period, a Fairhope Quaker dairy farmer named Hubert Mendenhall and his wife participated in an agricultural tour of Central America to find a new country to move to, deciding on Costa Rica due to its ideal land and lack of military. When Mendenhall returned to Alabama, news of his plans spread through the local Quaker community as well as to Quakers in Iowa, where the Mendenhall family originated. When the four draft-resistors were released from prison in November 1950, eleven Quaker families and over 40 people from Iowa and Alabama sold their homes and farms before moving to Costa Rica.

=== Establishment of Monteverde ===
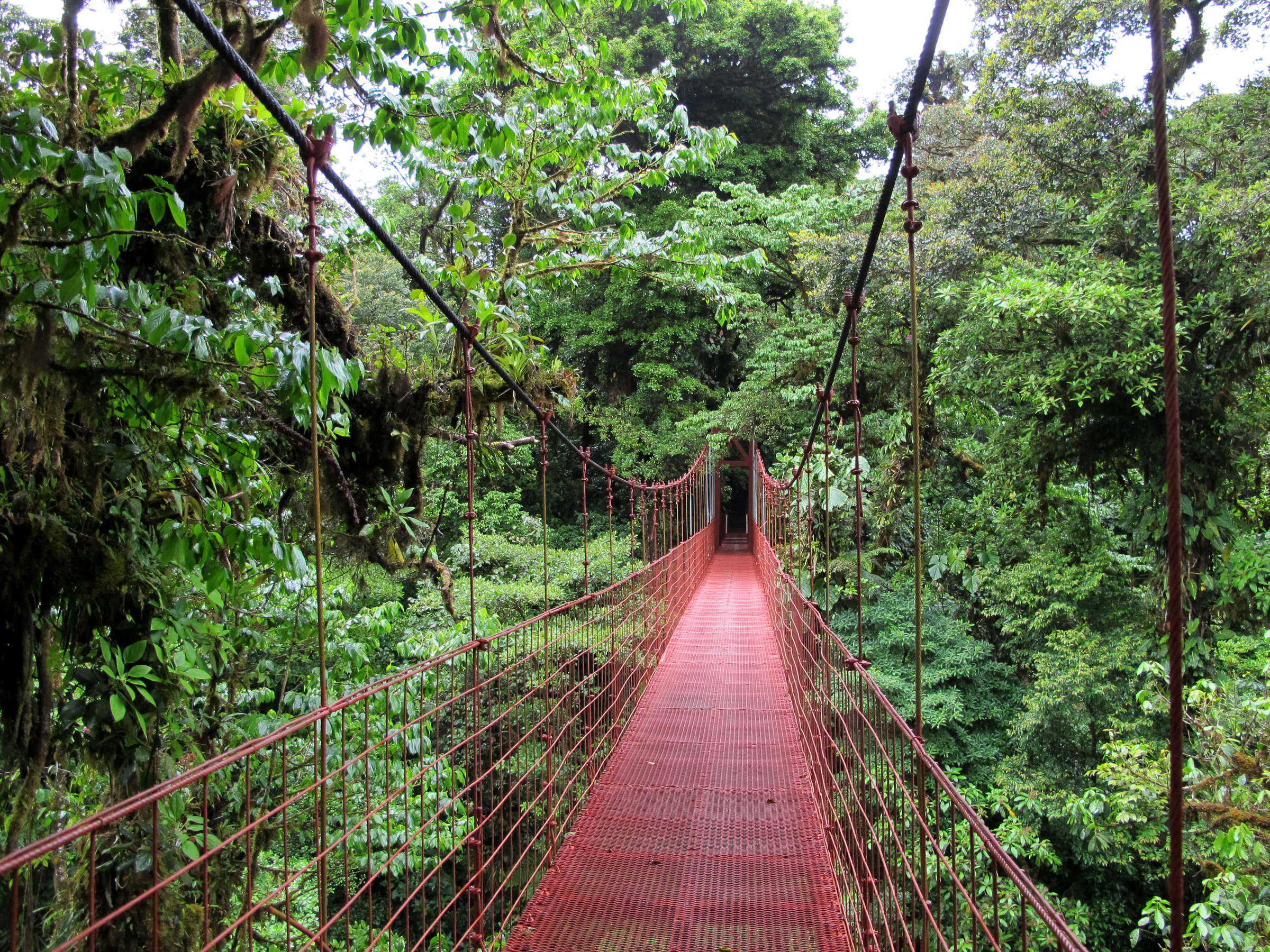
A Quaker from Alabama named Wilford "Wolf" Guindon founded the Monteverde Cloud Forest Reserve in the 1970s.

The Quakers purchased 1,400 hectares in the cloud forests of Costa Rica's Western Highlands in the Puntarenas Province. The land cost 400,000 Colones at the time. They arrived in 1951. At the time, the area was undeveloped and had no roads or electricity. They named their settlement Monteverde, which translates to "Green Mountain". The Quakers divided the land among the families and set aside one-third of the land to conserve the watershed of the Guacimal River.

A Quaker named John Campbell decided to make money by selling cheese, and the Monteverde Cheese Factory was established in 1952. In 1953, the settlers founded the Monteverde Dairy Producers Cooperative Limited, an agricultural cooperative that influenced the Costa Rican dairy industry by introducing sustainable farming and production practices. The Monteverde Friends School was built at the beginning of the settlement's history.

By promoting sustainable agriculture, the Quakers provided a viable economic alternative to deforestation or real estate development in the region, contributing to the conservation of Monteverde's rainforests. A Quaker from Alabama named Wilford "Wolf" Guindon founded the Monteverde Cloud Forest Reserve and Monteverde Conservation League in the 1970s. While most conservation agents in Costa Rica's protected areas carry weapons, members of the Monteverde Conservation League do not due to the influence of Quaker religious values. The Bosque Nuboso Biological Reserve was established in 1972 by a Quaker scientist that purchased the land from a mining company. In 1974, Quakers founded Bosqueterno, a reserve and organization dedicated to protecting the watershed of the Guacimal River.

=== Contemporary Monteverde ===
Quakers from the United States and Canada have continued to move to Monteverde for religious reasons and to join the local community. Many of the Quakers that now live in Monteverde are not descended from the original settlers but rather came later.

The foundation of the Monteverde Cloud Forest Reserve marked a turning point in Monteverde's history, attracting science and conservation interests as well as plentiful ecotourism. The discovery of the golden toad attracted scientists from across the world to Monteverde. Tourism strengthened the local economy, transforming the town from a small farming town into a major tourism hub. In 1986, Monteverde Quakers collaborated with biologists and conservationists to found the Monteverde Institute, which works to guide local ecotourism to sustain the local cloud forest ecosystems, as well as create local jobs and educational opportunities. In the 2010s, the Institute began developing greywater filters to combat greywater pollution in the community.

The original Monteverde Cheese Factory was purchased by the Mexican company Sigma Alimentos in 2013, and as of 2015 produced 3,300 kilograms (7,300 lb) of cheese every day. A history museum called Historica Monteverde was established in 2015, and most of its artifacts focus on the history of the area's Quaker community. Prior to the global COVID-19 pandemic, the city attracted over 200,000 annual tourists. The global pandemic put stress on Monteverde's ecotourism industry, forcing many residents in the tourism sector to return to agriculture and informal labor. The tourism sector grew rapidly once again in 2024 after the pandemic ended.

In 2025, US president Donald Trump pressured the government of Costa Rica into accepting asylum seekers that were deported from the United States during his second presidency. The Quaker community in Monteverde collaborated with other residents to raise money to support these new arrivals into the country. They helped many of them find places to rent, helped their children attend school, and helped them find new jobs.
