= Edward H. Milligan =

Quaker historian (1922–2020)

Edward Hyslop Milligan (27 March 1922 – 26 July 2020), also known as Ted Milligan, was a Quaker historian and the former librarian at Friends House, London. He was the author of The Biographical Dictionary of British Quakers in Commerce and Industry 1775-1920, which includes entries for some 2,800 people. He received the 2009 Besterman/McColvin Award for this work and an Honorary degree from Lancaster University The ‘’Biographical Dictionary’’ was reviewed in ‘’Archives’’, ‘’The Friend’’, ‘’Friends Quarterly’’, ‘’Quaker Studies’’, ‘’Quaker History’’, and ‘’The Journal of the Friends Historical Society’’.

Educated at Ackworth School and the University of Reading, he was the Librarian and Archivist of Meeting for Sufferings of Britain Yearly Meeting, responsible for the Library at Friends House, London for 25 years from 1957 to 1985. He was succeeded by Malcolm J Thomas.

On his retirement, he was presented with a Festschrift: A Quaker miscellany for Edward H. Milligan, edited by David Blamires, Jeremy Greenwood and Alex Kerr (1985). This includes:

- "A bibliography of the writings of Edward H Milligan to 1984" by David Hall and Malcolm Thomas. The diversity of his interests and the erudition of his friends is shown by the contents of the Miscellany:
- E. H. M. at Yearly Meeting 1984. Photograph by Roger Haworth, courtesy The Friend
- 'My! How you've grown!'", by Chris Barber
- Joseph Sherwood, Quaker attorney and notary c.1734-73, by Melanie Barber
- Quakers observed in verse and prose, by David Blamires
- Cushions on every other bench: a basis for rapprochement among American Friends, by Tom Bodine
- The ramblings of a recording clerk, by Geoffrey Bowes
- Local variations in Quaker meeting houses' by David Butler
- Quakers and Muggletonians in seventeenth-century Ireland, by Kenneth L. Carroll
- Wounded healers: ministry and pastoral care in a broken world, by Jo Farrow (Quaker)
- Rather odd people, by Elfrida Vipont Foulds
- Quakers in the looking-glass of the stage, by Ormerod Greenwood
- English and Irish Quakers and Irish Home Rule 1886-93, by Howard F. Gregg
- Written epistles of London Yearly Meeting in the eighteenth century, by David J. Hall
- God at London Yearly Meeting 1900, by Hope Hewison
- Thomas Rickman in France, by Alex Kerr
- The essence of Friends House: a view from the centre, by Jon North
- Women in the Society of Friends, by Janet Scott
- The Committee on General Meetings 1875-83, by Malcolm J. Thomas
- A cartoon by Lesley Webster
- The 1966 statement on membership in the Religious Society of Friends: a memoir, by Arthur J. White
- 'We shall never thrive upon ignorance' (J.J.Gurney): the service of John Wilhelm Rowntree 1893-1905, by Roger C. Wilson
- Subscribers, Colophon, Contributors

== Publications ==
- Britannica on Quakerism (1965) - reproducing the Encyclopædia Britannica article.
- The Past Is Prologue: 100 Years of Quaker Overseas Work 1868-1968. (1968).
- My Ancestors Were Quakers: How Can I Find Out More About Them?, with Malcolm J. Thomas. Society of Genealogists "My ancestor" series, First published in 1983. Reprinted several times - current 1999.
- So Numerous a Family: 200 Years of Quaker Education at Ackworth, 1779-1979, with Elfrida Vipont Foulds (1979).
- Quakers & Railways (1992).
- Quaker marriage (1994) Quaker tapestry booklet series.
- The Biographical Dictionary of British Quakers in Commerce and Industry 1775-1920 (2007).
- Pictorial Guide to the Quaker Tapestry, (1998).
- Respectable rebels: : a Quaker history of William and Anne (nee Tuke) Alexander's family from 1660 (2015) Quacks Books
- ODNB: Ted Milligan has contributed 18 articles to the Oxford Dictionary of National Biography.
