= Conservation in Costa Rica =

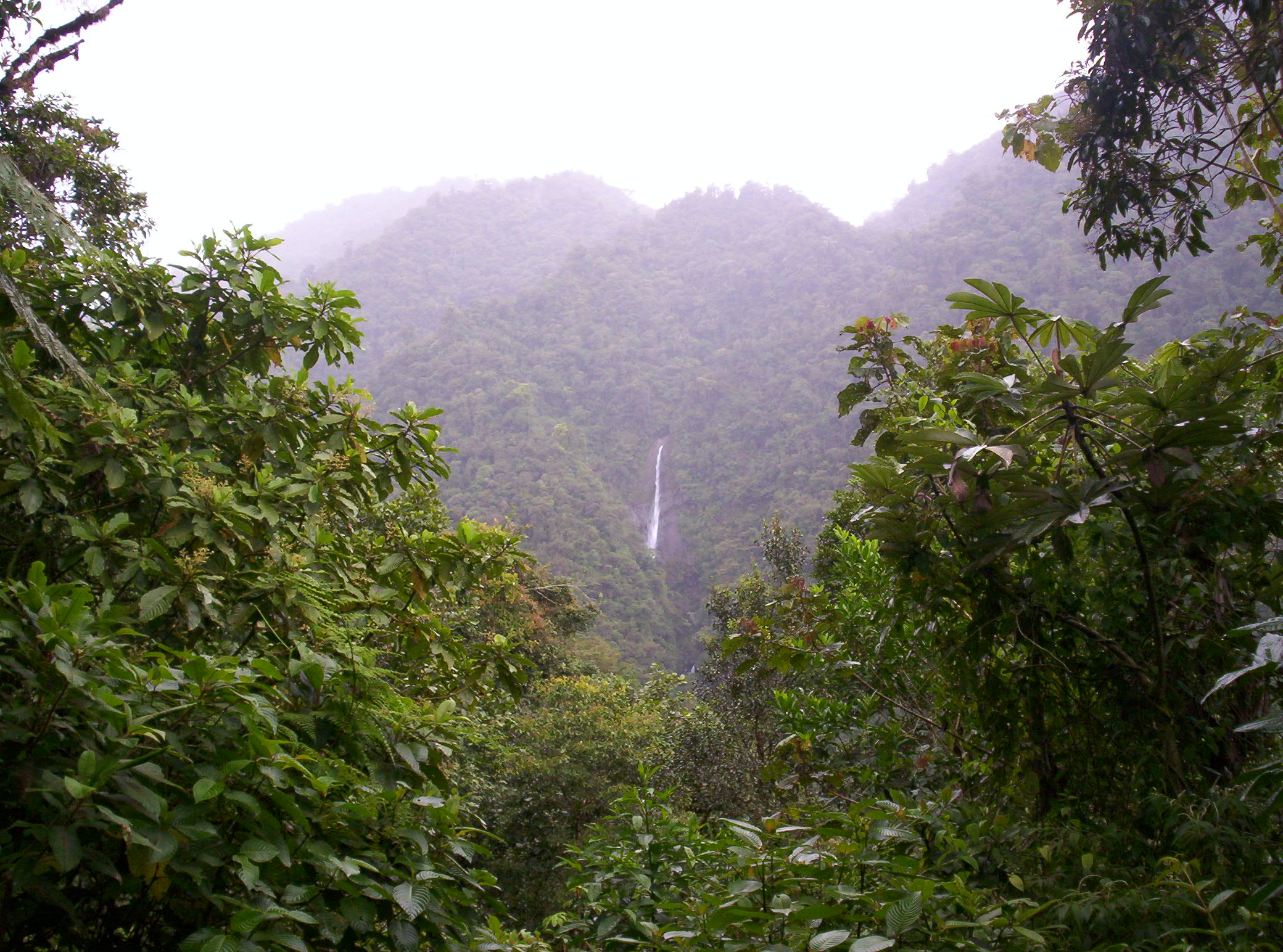
Tapantí National Park

Although the conservation movement developed in Europe in the 18th century, Costa Rica as a country has been heralded its champion in the current times. Costa Rica hosts an astonishing number of species, given its size, having more animal and plant species than the US and Canada combined hosting over 500,000 species of plants and animals. Despite this, Costa Rica is only 250 miles long and 150 miles wide. A widely accepted theory for the origin of this unusual density of species is the free mixing of species from both North and South America occurring on this "inter-oceanic" and "inter-continental" landscape. Preserving the natural environment of this fragile landscape, therefore, has drawn the attention of many international scholars and scientists.

MINAE (Ministry of Environment, Energy and Telecommunications) and its responsible for many conservation efforts in Costa Rica it achieves through its many agencies, including SINAC (National System of Conservation Areas), FONAFIFO (national forest fund), and CONAGEBIO (National Commission for Biodiversity Management).

Costa Rica has made conservation a national priority, and has been at the forefront of preserving its natural environment with 28% of its land protected in the form of national parks, reserves, and wildlife refuges, which is under the administrative control of SINAC (National System of Conservation Areas) a division of MINAE (Ministry of Environment, Energy and Telecommunications). SINAC has subdivided the country into various zones depending on the ecological diversity of that region - as seen in figure 1. The country has used this ecological diversity to its economic advantage in the form of a thriving ecotourism industry, putting its commitment to nature, on display to visitors from across the globe. The tourism market in Costa Rica is estimated to grow by USD 1.34 billion from 2023 to 2028, growing at a CAGR of 5.76%.

It is also the only country in the world that generates more than 99% of its electricity from renewable sources, relying on hydropower (72%), wind (13%), geothermal energy (15%), biomass and solar (1%). Critics have pointed out however, that in achieving this milestone, the country has built several dams (providing the bulk of its electricity) some of which have negatively impacted indigenous communities as well as the local flora and fauna.

== Historical development ==
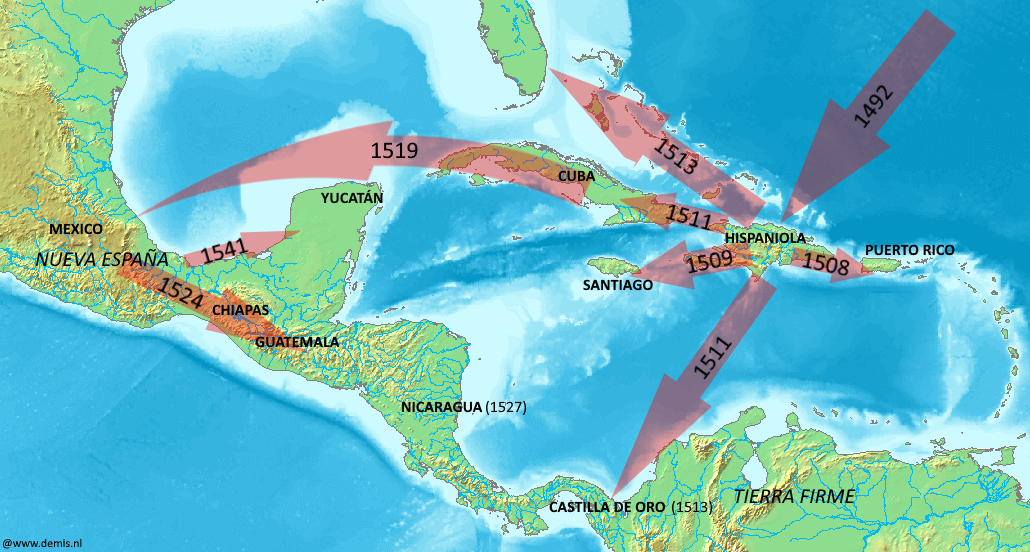
Figure 3. 16th century Spanish expansion in the Caribbean

"The Green Republic: A Conservation History of Costa Rica" by Sterling Evans is a renowned book that traces the development of the conservation movement in Costa Rica from the mid 1700s to present day. Evans mentions that when the Spaniards first arrived in the Americas, the landscape of Costa Rica did not appear particularly hospitable to them, compared to Guatemala or Mexico which seemed more reminiscent of the Spanish climate. Therefore, up until the 18th century, there was very little agricultural development in the region. It also lacked gold and other minerals that Christopher Columbus had hoped to find in these areas (hence the name, Rich Coast). As a result, the forest cover of Costa Rica was left more or less intact by the European settlement in the Americas.

By the mid-19th century, it was observed that the Costa Rican soil was particularly conducive to the growth of coffee. The global demand for coffee was growing rapidly, fueled by the demand from the working class in the industrializing west. The agricultural model adopted by coffee growers in Costa Rica was of small family owned farms known as cafeteras, and they strove to be responsible stewards of the land. This approach was in stark contrast to the coffee monoculture that would've developed by adopting a purely capitalistic ideology. As a result, even though the coffee production increased substantially from 1850 to 1950, there wasn't large scale deforestation in Costa Rica until the 1950s, contrary to popular belief.

Some of the key points often overlooked in Costa Rica's conservation history between 1850 and 2000 according to Evans, are as follows:

1. President Bernardo Soto's government in 1888 began the process of attracting scholars from all over the world, particularly Switzerland and Germany in an effort to educate the locals about agricultural practices harmonious with the environment such that by 1914, Costa Rica became a leading scientific research center in tropical America

2. The establishment of the University of Costa Rica (UCR) in the 1940s was a landmark event, since the university acted as a springboard for research into tropical studies in Central America. At the helm of UCR were many influential academics such as Rafael Lucas Rodríguez and Alexander Skutch whose forward thinking publications served as a foundation for the future policy decisions. Skutch noted,

"in the mid-1930s, Costa Rica was still largely unspoiled. Its population of less than a half a million people . . .was concentrated in the narrow Meseta Central. . . . Other advantages . . . to the naturalist were its political stability and the friendliness of its people. . . . Costa Rica has a record of continuous, orderly constitutional government that scarcely any other country in Latin America can match. Thus the naturalist working in some remote spot was not likely to have his studies suddenly interrupted or his thin lines of communication cut by a violent upheaval, as has happened to many in Latin America. ."

3. By 1950, Costa Rica became heavily reliant on coffee exports to Europe and the US. Around the same time, it was battling the dilemma between increasing agricultural output on one hand and protecting natural resources for future use on the other. In 1958, however, the world coffee prices plummeted, and Costa Rica's main source of income was shown to be very vulnerable to unpredictable forces. The government responded by promoting internal manufacturing and encouraging other industries. One such industry that emerged as a result, was the meat industry.

The Central American valley has been described as "perfect for cattle" by Carl Hoffman. Until 1970, the cattle raised in Costa Rica were primarily used for domestic consumption. Around 1970, the demand for beef from the US started showing an exponential growth due to the rise of the fast-food industry. This robust demand, coupled with the falling coffee prices gave the cattle industry a boost and forests started getting replaced with pastures. At its worst, Costa Rica was losing 4% of its forested area per year.

An alternative analysis by Julia Flagg within the framework of "process-tracing" reveals that after gaining independence in 1821 the isolation of Costa Rica from El Salvador, Honduras, Guatemala, and Nicaragua was critical in shaping its future and served as a divergence point in the evolution of the Central American nations. According to Mahoney “ . . . while all of the other provinces quickly became engulfed in warfare and political chaos, Costa Rica escaped such devastation and made tentative economic strides forward”. She also argues that the lack of a land-owning elite class in Costa Rica was instrumental in the development of good governance and maintaining a stable democracy in the country. The abolishing of the military in 1948 helped free up valuable resources that the government chose to invest into education and resource protection. The country entered into a positive reinforcement cycle thereafter, where new laws enacted drew international praise which helped solidify Costa Rica's position as global leader in resource protection .

"Green Republic" by Sterling Evans examines the history of conservation in Costa Rica, challenging the perception of it as a flawless "green republic." Costa Rica's conservation efforts emerged amidst significant environmental degradation, driven by factors like agricultural expansion and land redistribution. Evans traces the evolution of conservation policy, highlighting key moments such as the Ley Forestal of 1969 and the establishment of a national park system. Despite challenges, Costa Rica made strides in conservation through initiatives like debt-for-nature swaps and the involvement of NGOs. However, issues like the sustainability of ecotourism underscore the ongoing complexities of balancing conservation with economic development. Overall, Evans offers a nuanced view of Costa Rica's conservation journey, acknowledging successes while recognizing ongoing challenges.

== Examples of active efforts ==
=== National Park System ===
Costa Rica boasts a network of protected areas, including national parks, wildlife refuges, and biological reserves. These areas safeguard diverse ecosystems, such as rainforests, cloud forests, beaches, and coral reefs, protecting a wide range of flora and fauna.

Like any natural area, Costa Rican conservation areas have rules and regulations meant to protect the species that call them home. Most rules are common sense, like a prohibition on hunting, going off marked trails, removing specimens such as plants, animals, or shells, and going into volcano craters

=== Ecotourism ===
Costa Rica has become a global leader in ecotourism, attracting travelers eager to explore its natural wonders while minimizing their environmental impact. The country offers numerous eco-lodges, nature tours, and adventure activities, generating revenue that supports conservation efforts and local communities.

=== Biodiversity Research and Monitoring ===
Institutions like the National Biodiversity Institute (INBio) conduct research to document and conserve Costa Rica's rich biodiversity. Through initiatives such as biodiversity surveys, genetic research, and habitat monitoring, scientists contribute valuable data to inform conservation policies and practices.

=== Community-Based Conservation ===
Costa Rica encourages community participation in conservation through initiatives like community-managed reserves and conservation easements. By empowering local communities to manage natural resources sustainably, these efforts promote environmental stewardship and support livelihoods.

Bureaucratic barriers within government structures can impede the implementation of community conservation initiatives, using Costa Rica as a case study. Basurto contrasts two approaches: government-driven decentralization and bottom-up participatory control. In regions where decentralization was led by the government, power remained centralized and excluded rural communities from decision-making. Conversely, in areas like the Guanacaste Conservation Area, community-based governance thrived through local involvement and fair compensation mechanisms. Successful incorporation of community conservation initiatives, such as ICCAs, requires addressing bureaucratic dynamics, strong central support, local demand for participation, and establishment of supportive institutional structures.

=== Sustainable Agriculture ===
Efforts to promote sustainable agricultural practices aim to reduce environmental degradation caused by conventional farming methods. Initiatives include organic farming, agroforestry, and certification programs that encourage producers to adopt eco-friendly techniques while maintaining productivity.

=== Payment for Environmental Services Program (PES) ===
To counter reducing forest area coverage in the 1980s, the Costa Rican government pioneered a scheme in 1997 known as PES, which rewarded private land owners for keeping forests intact on their lands in lieu of the services provided by these forests to the environment and the economy as a whole. The World Bank, which provided the loan initially from 2000 to 2006 to support the payments incentivizing afforestation, viewed the program as a success overall despite some of its shortcomings.

It is estimated that the percentage of Costa Rican land covered by forests has gone up from around 20% in the 1980s to over 50% of the total area in 2013 - a growth of 250%. The program has also reduced the national carbon emissions by 11 million tons over a period of 6 years from 1999 to 2005. Indigenous communities and women in particular, have benefited due to this program. Buoyed by this success, the World Bank extended its support to the Costa Rican government's initiative by funding a new program titled "Mainstreaming Market-Based Instruments for Environmental Management". Over the years, many international agencies have pushed the national government to make the process of obtaining the payments easier so as to include more underdeveloped communities and cast a wider net for the program.

=== Marine Conservation ===
Costa Rica has established marine protected areas (MPAs) to safeguard its coastal and marine ecosystems, including coral reefs, mangroves, and sea turtle nesting beaches. These MPAs restrict fishing activities, protect critical habitats, and promote sustainable use of marine resources.

Green Sea Turtle

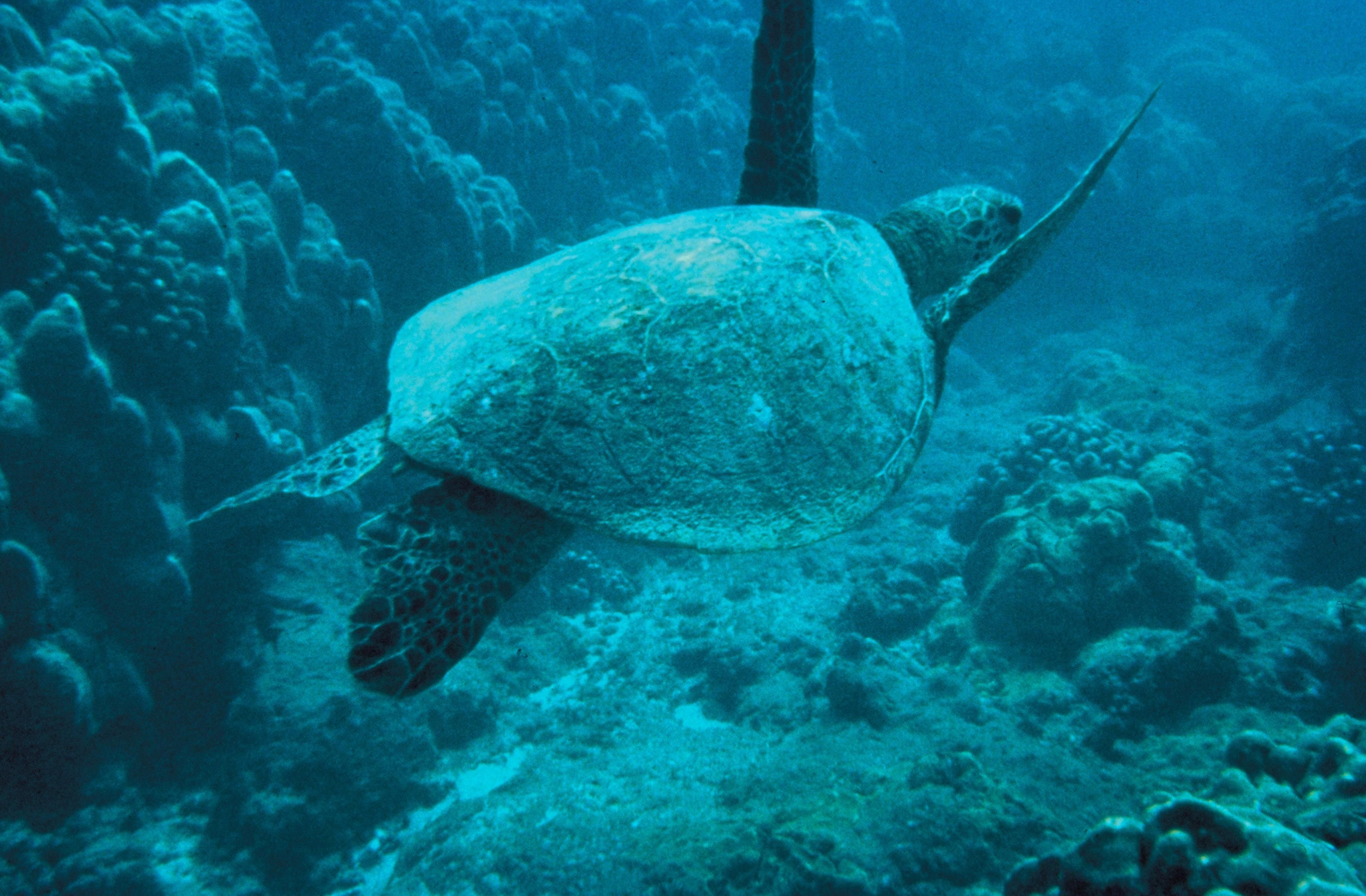
A Green sea turtle

The green sea turtle is a globally endangered species and one of the most important nesting grounds for it is in Tortuguero, Costa Rica - the word Totuguero is derived from old Spanish maps meaning "place of turtles". After a steady global decline in its population due to overhunting for its meat and eggs, the Tortuguero National Park was established in 1975 in an effort to protect and save the turtle's breeding zone. A highly cited study by Tröeng and Rankin, investigated in 2004, the effects that this protective measure has had on the nesting trend. Although the population of turtles shows a large inter-annual variation thus making the task of determining the exact number very difficult, on an average, the trend has been positive over a long time scale of almost 35 years. The study illustrated that the enactment of three laws by the Costa Rican government was vital in stabilizing and increasing the population of these green sea turtles.

1. A ban on turtle and egg collection in 1963

2. A ban on the export of calipee (a part of the turtle's head that is considered a delicacy) in 1970 and finally,

3. The creation of the Tortuguero National Park in 1975 by the legislative assembly.

The lasting impact created by such forward thinking political decisions exhibits the necessity of meaningful governmental intervention.

4. MarViva Foundation's Marine Protected Areas: MarViva Foundation works to establish and manage marine protected areas (MPAs) along the coasts of Costa Rica and other countries in the Eastern Tropical Pacific. These MPAs provide important habitat for sea turtles and other marine species, helping to conserve biodiversity and promote sustainable fisheries practices.

5. Volunteer Programs with WIDECAST: The Wider Caribbean Sea Turtle Conservation Network (WIDECAST) collaborates with local organizations in Costa Rica to run volunteer programs focused on sea turtle conservation. Volunteers participate in activities such as nest monitoring, beach clean-ups, and community outreach. Programs are typically offered from May to November, coinciding with the nesting season.

The lasting impact created by such forward thinking political decisions exhibits the necessity of meaningful governmental intervention.

Conservation International Costa Rica (CI Costa Rica), the Costa Rica programme of Conservation International, works on ocean and coastal conservation planning and marine spatial planning, and participates in the Transforma-Innova consortium focused on low-carbon and climate-resilient practices in agriculture, livestock and marine-coastal systems.

=== Reforestation & Restoration Programs ===
Through the implementation of regulatory measures aimed at environmental protection and the establishment of the Payment for Environmental Services (PSA) Program, Costa Rica has made significant strides in reclaiming a considerable portion of its protected areas. Funded by the State through the National Forestry Financing Fund (FONAFIFO), the PSA Program focuses on forest conservation, management, reforestation, and natural regeneration, resulting in the enhancement of protected areas spanning 437,000 hectares. This initiative has facilitated the planting of 5.4 million trees by farmers and has supported forest conservation efforts within indigenous territories. Nevertheless, despite the expansion of secondary forests, deforestation for agricultural purposes persists, as some farmers are hesitant to forego agricultural land for forest regeneration. Over the period from 1996 to 2015, PSA projects dedicated to reforestation garnered a substantial investment of 318 million USD, with 64% of the funding sourced from taxes on fossil fuels and 22% from loans provided by the World Bank.

== Carbon neutral goal ==
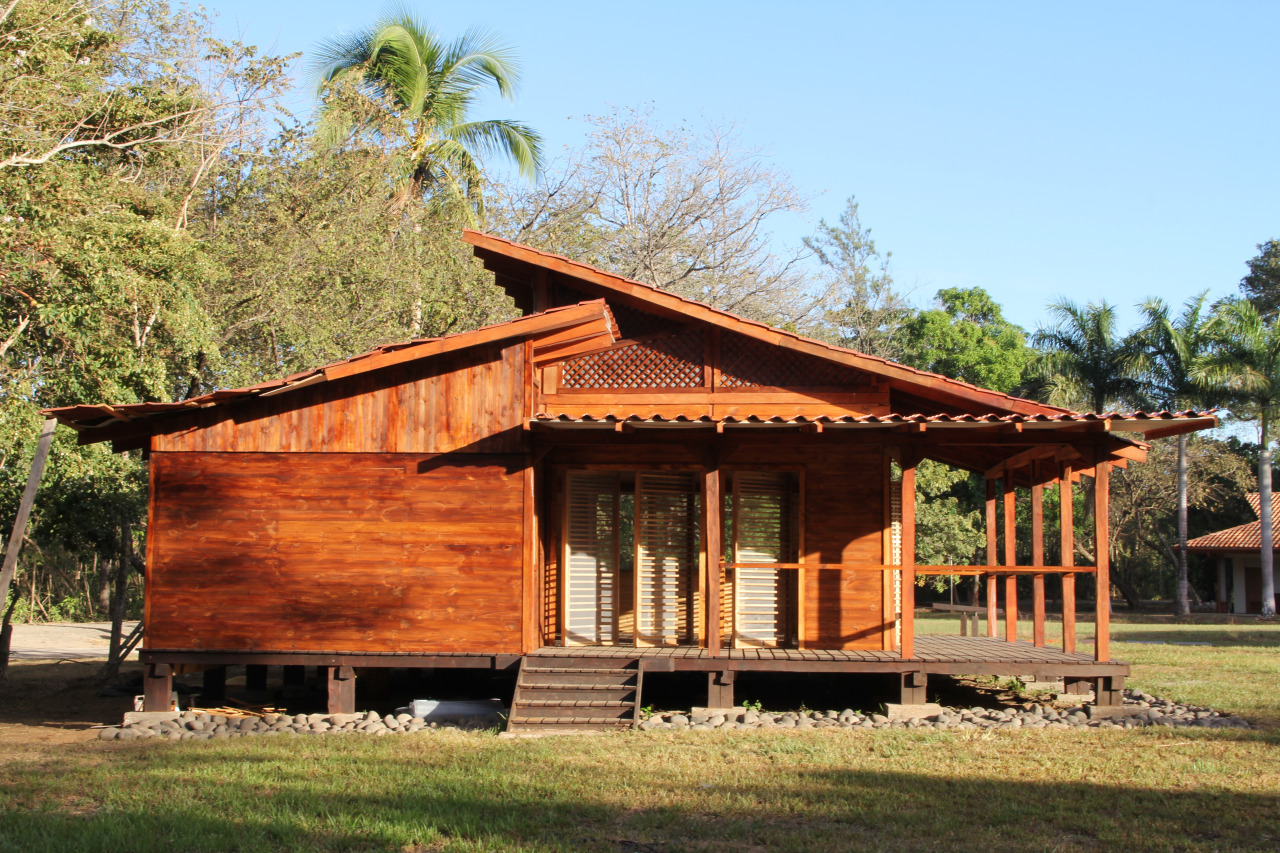
Classroom of Earth University in Costa Rica - a carbon neutral university

Costa Rica stands out among nations for its ambitious commitment to reducing carbon emissions, as evidenced by its National Decarbonization Plan. This plan targets achieving net-zero emissions by 2050 and has been identified as highly promising in a RAND study. The study suggests that the investments made in carbon-reduction measures as part of this plan would yield a return of approximately 110 percent. In her concluding project as RAND artist-in-residence, Gabrielle Mérite aimed to visually depict Costa Rica's journey towards a carbon-neutral future, drawing inspiration from the Solarpunk art movement, which envisions a more sustainable world.

== Criticisms of active efforts ==
The government's approach to attain zero net emissions has yielded positive results overall, but has been described as insufficient and lacking by experts because it neglects vehicular emissions which account for nearly 20% of the country's total emissions. The 2021 target has also been called "arbitrary" and "overambitious", since the efforts to reduce the country's reliance on imported oil will take much longer to take effect.

In 2006, a study by Sierra and Russman analyzed the additional conservation obtained through PES, over and above the baseline conservation rate. The study concluded that the PES program definitely affected land use decisions because land owners used the payments for other productive activities thus keeping the forest cover intact. However, they also concluded that this was not the most effective use of funds because the majority of these forests would have remained intact even without the payments. The study suggested that it would a better strategy to engage in the protection of more critical habitats instead.

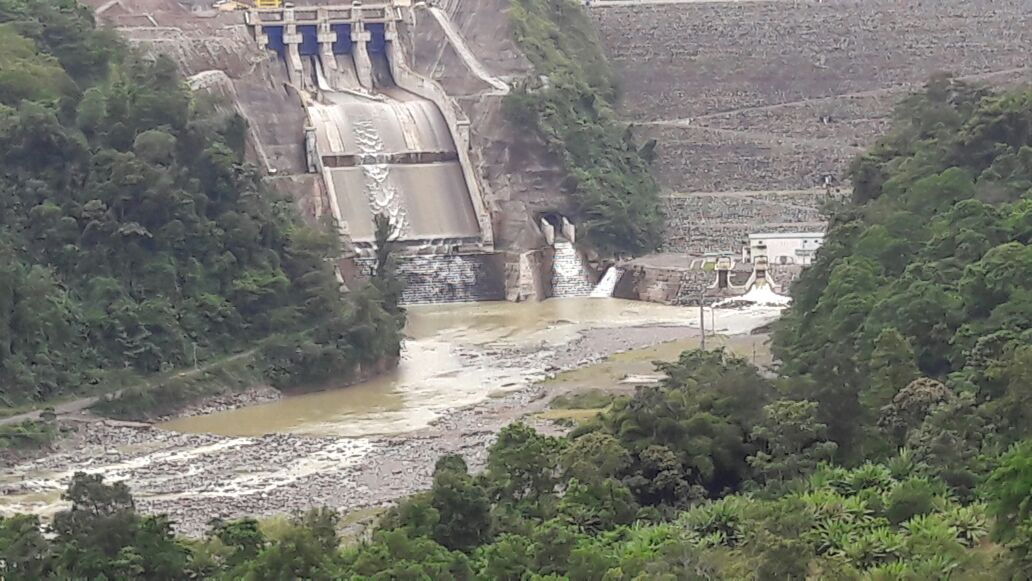
The Reventazón Dam has come under criticism recently for the loss of habitat it has caused for many species.

The jaguar is an endangered species and its habitat came under threat due to construction of the Reventazón Dam in the Reventazón valley. The Reventazón dam is the largest dam in Central America with an installed capacity of 305.5 MW. The two financiers of the project, the World Bank and the Inter-American Development Bank, financed it on the condition that the construction of the dam by the state-run Costa Rican Electricity Institute (ICE) would "restore and maintain connectivity within the Barbilla-Destierro Corridor" which is critical to the survival of the jaguar.

Protestors of this project claim that the construction has failed to meet the expectations on the following issues:

1) The constructors did not completely clear vegetation from the areas that would be flooded due to this project. As a result, the uncleared vegetation in the flooded areas began to stagnate, creating the perfect conditions for the growth of the Water Hyacinth (an invasive species). The Water Hyacinth acted as a source for a large amount of carbon dioxide and methane emitted into the atmosphere.

2) Reforestation around the reservoir lake to assist in the migration of the jaguars has not been completed making their movement more difficult.

3) Due to the removal of a lot of material to facilitate construction, the neighboring Lancaster wetlands (home to more than 250 species of birds and 80 species of mammals, reptiles and amphibians) have been left in a state more susceptible to landslides.

What appears to be common in these criticisms is that the initiatives have moved things in the right direction overall, but the implementation hasn't been as good as promised.
