= The Biographical Dictionary of British Quakers in Commerce and Industry, 1775–1920 =

Book by Edward H. Milligan

- Author: Edward H. Milligan
- Publication date: 2007

The Biographical Dictionary of British Quakers in Commerce and Industry, 1775–1920, by Edward H. Milligan, includes entries for some 2,800 people, arranged alphabetically. The last page is numbered 606.

== Author ==
The author is the former Librarian and Archivist of Meeting for Sufferings (the executive committee) of Britain Yearly Meeting (the central national body), who was responsible for the Library at Friends House, London and the co-operative biography project with two Quaker colleges in the United States. The author received the 2009 Besterman/McColvin Award for this work.

== See also ==
- History of the Quakers
