= Hester Biddle =

English Quaker writer and preacher c. 1629–1697

Hester (or Esther) Biddle (c. 1629–1697) was an English Quaker writer and itinerant preacher who "addressed pugnacious pamphlets to those who persecuted religious dissenters, worshipped in the Anglican church, or refused to help the poor." She became a Quaker in 1654. Her subsequent preaching took her to Ireland and Scotland, Newfoundland, the Netherlands, Barbados, Alexandria, and France.

== Life ==
Nothing is known of Hester Biddle's family origin, except that she was born in Oxford and brought up as an Anglican. She disapproved of the abolition of the Book of Common Prayer in the Cromwellian period. Her conversion to the Quakers took place after hearing Edward Burrough and Francis Howgill preach in 1654.

All her writings appeared under her married name, so that her marriage would have taken place before 1655. Her husband was the shoemaker Thomas Biddle (died 1682), with whom she lived in the Old Exchange area of the City of London until the Great Fire of 1666, and then in Bermondsey, on the South Bank. They had four sons, of whom one died in infancy. She lived in comparative poverty after she was widowed, but received five shillings a week from the Quaker Peel monthly meeting.

Hester Biddle died in the parish of St Sepulchre, Bermondsey on 5 February 1697 at the age of 67. Her eldest son Benjamin was appointed as executor of her estate.

== Preaching and writing ==
Biddle stated that she found "Peace of Conscience" on joining the Quakers in 1654. Her first two broadsides (similar in content) appeared in May 1665 and proclaimed "wo" (woe) to Oxford and Cambridge for their financial and ideological domination. These already link her voice (as "I") with God's light within her, in accordance with Quaker teaching.

Quaker writing accounted for a high proportion of the work produced by women in the mid-17th century. Biddle and Dorothy White exemplify this output. It is thought that about one-third of the Quakers arrested for disrupting church services were women. However, cultivation of a specifically "female" tone or subject-matter would have run up against the Quaker desire to merge the self into God.

Apart from the fierce persecution of Quaker preachers in that period, it was still illegal for a woman to deliver an address in public. Biddle suffered a probable 14 arrests and imprisonments and in some cases was beaten as well. However, she continued to produce a string of provocative pamphlets. Her 1662 work The Trumpet of the Lord Sounded forth unto these Three Nations (i. e. England, Scotland and Ireland) was written while she was actually imprisoned in Newgate. Here she insisted that "we are not like the World, who must have a Priest to interpret the Scriptures to them... the Lord doth not speak to us in an unknown Tongue, but in our own Language do we hear him perfectly." She also rounded on her hearers for their sinful lives: "Drunkenness, Whoredom, and Glutony, and all manner of Ungodliness, Tyranny and Oppresion, is found in thee; Thy Priests preach for hire, and thy People love to have it so... Stage-Playes, Ballad Singing, Cards, and Dice, and all manner of Folly... wicked words & actions are not punished by thee." Her awareness of social and economic equality is made plain in the same work: "Did not the Lord make all men and women upon the earth of one mould, why then should there be so much honour and respect unto some men and women, and not unto others, but they are almost naked for want of Cloathing, and almost starved for want of Bread?"

Biddle's travels within Britain took her to Oxford (1655), Cornwall (1656), Ireland (1659), and Scotland (1672). She also made frequent journeys abroad. There exist accounts of her ministry and travels in Newfoundland (1656, with Mary Fisher), the Netherlands (1656 and 1661), Barbados (1657), and Alexandria (1658). She met other prominent female Quakers – Katherine Evans and Sarah Cheevers, and Mary Fisher – on her way.

Most famous of all was her visit to France (1694–95). Having previously visited Mary II of England, she obtained permission to address Louis XIV of France, during which – in line with her Quaker beliefs – she urged him to pursue policies of peace. Her final work was A Brief Relation (1662), which describes how she dismissed the admonishments of the court while she was on trial for preaching: "Christ is my husband, and I learn of him."

== External resource ==
- The text of The Trumpet of the Lord... appears in Paul Salzman, ed.: Early Modern Women's Writing: An Anthology (Oxford, UK: Oxford University Press, 2000), pp. 148–66. Retrieved 30 April 2015.
