= Chris Barber (philanthropist) =

British businessman (1921–2012)

Christopher Bayldon Barber (19 March 1921 – 8 July 2012) was a British Quaker businessman and was the Chairman of Oxfam from 1983 to 1989.

== Early life and education ==
Barber was son of Quaker parents William Bayldon Barber (1874–1939), a director of the Friends' Provident Life Office founded by his grandfather, and Gladys Mary, née Jacob, whose family owned Jacob's Biscuits. He was educated at Bootham School, York.

== Career ==
=== War ===
As a Quaker, 18-year-old Barber was opposed to war and chose to join the Friends Ambulance Unit before he was called up. He faced a Conscientious Objector Tribunal, refusing to seek favourable treatment by declaring himself a Quaker. He was, however, permitted to join the FAU, with whom he worked until 1947. His service included a period of war relief work in China.

=== The Biscuits business ===
When he returned, he trained as an accountant and joined the family firm, Jacob's Biscuits, in 1949. By innovations, mergers and acquisitions, the firm grew to become Huntley & Palmer then Associated Biscuits and he rose to be Finance Director. He retired in 1980.

=== Famine relief ===
In 1980, he had joined the Board of Trustees of Oxfam. In 1983, he became its chair, in which role he served until 1989. "Oxfam grew dramatically and, in his role as chairman, Chris was keen to ensure that the extra donations were used well, not just to tackle famine but to ensure sustainable development thereafter. His was a wise and compassionate hand on the tiller."

He was a "hands-on" Chair and was deeply concerned with Oxfam's decision, in November 1985, to close its bank account at Barclays Bank because of Barclays involvement with the South African Apartheid regime. He travelled to South America, India and Sudan and sorted out a diplomatic disaster in Cambodia. Long after his retirement, he could be found helping out at the Oxfam bookshop in Henley.

== Quaker activities ==
Chris Barber and his wife, Anne had met at their Quaker schools in York. They married in January 1952. A son is the educationist Sir Michael Barber. Both were active in local, regional and national Quaker activities. Chris, among other roles, was Chairman of the Social Responsibility Council, 1970 – 1972; Clerk of Quaker Social Responsibility and education, 1979 – 1981. He served on Quaker Peace and Service Central Committee from 1993 to 1998

== Other activities ==
The obituary in The Henley Standard said:

". . . he was known for organising treasure hunts on and around Peppard Common and many other activities involving local families. For several years he organised a hockey match at New Year on a field near the Dog in Peppard with 20 or 30 people, from small children to ageing grandparents, on each side and no referee! Fortunately, the games were all played in good spirit and there were no injuries. On one occasion, the match was played in deep snow.".

== Writings ==
These items are listed on the catalogue of The Library of the Society of Friends, London. This list is in date order:

- The sharing of resources : problems of aid and development / [prepared by Christopher B. Barber and Olive Prescott for the Committee on Sharing World Resources]. – London : Society of Friends. London Yearly Meeting. Home Service Committee, 1970. – 32 p.; 19 cm.. – (Study in fellowship series; 31)
- FAU postscript : some reflections of former Friends Ambulance Unit members, on what their Unit experience of 40 years earlier has meant to them / collated by Chris Barber. – Oxford : Oxfam, 1984. – 48 p.; 21 cm.
- 'My! How you've grown!'" a contribution to a Festschrift: A Quaker miscellany for Edward H. Milligan (1985).
- "Friends to China : the Davidson brothers and the Friends' Mission to China 1886–1939, by Charles Tyzack / [review by Chris Barber]. – In: The Journal of the Friends Historical Society; Vol.55; no.8 (1989), p. 291.
- China letters : letters written home by Chris Barber during his F.A.U. service abroad 1942–46, 1993. – 259 p. : ill.; 30 cm. – unpublished typescript, held at The Library of the Society of Friends.
- China letters : letters written home by Chris Barber during his F.A.U. service abroad 1942–46, 1993. – 259 p. : ill.; 30 cm. – unpublished typescript, held at The Library of the Society of Friends.
- Reflections on a China tour : revisiting the roads of West China, May 1996 : members of the Friends Ambulance Unit China Convoy go back after fifty years / by Christopher B. Barber [et al.]; edited by Christopher B. Barber and Theodore M. Mills : Friends Ambulance Unit China Convoy, 1997. – [vi], 125 p.; 30 cm.
- "Our sense of common humanity" / Chris Barber. – In: The Friends' Quarterly; Vol.31; no.2 (April 1998), p. 57–68

== Sources ==
- Obituary in The Times, 20/08/20112: "Chris Barber: accountant who in retirement led Oxfam and guided the organisation through a challenging decade."
- Obituary in the Henley Standard, 21/08/2012 “Quaker company director who became Oxfam chairman”. (with portrait).
- "Anne Satterthwaite Barber", in Epistles and Testimonies 2008, part of the Proceedings of Britain Yearly Meeting 2008, Religious Society of Friends (Quakers), pages 6 and 7
