= Dorcas Dole =

English Quaker pamphleteer

Dorcas Dole (fl. later 17th century) was a Quaker religious pamphleteer from Bristol, England, of whose background and private life little certain is known. She may have been the Dorcas Dole married to a Bristol silk weaver, John Dole, who died in 1699. She herself died in 1717.

== Quaker emphases ==
Earlier Quaker preachers and pamphleteers, male and female, had been forthright in their political criticisms, even while serving jail sentences, but their approach became more compliant after the Restoration. Quakers became less willing to defend women publicly, for instance if they had disrupted church services.

Exact charges against Dole have yet to be clarified, but she was "harshly treated for praying and preaching in prison." Nonetheless, politics entered into an influential pamphlet written by Dole while she was in Bristol's Bridewell Prison: Salutation and Seasonable Exhortation to Children was addressed in 1682 to the children "who kept up the meetings in Bristol when the adult members were in prison." Published in 1683 and reprinted in 1700, its main concern was with disobedience among the Quaker children: "For though you are Young and Tender in Years, you know not how soon the Messenger of Death may come to call you."

Another pamphlet published in Bristol by Dorcas Dole in 1683 and again in 1684 was Once more a Warning to Thee, O England, but more particularly to the inhabitants of the city of Bristol. She was in Bristol's Newgate Prison at the time and describes her conditions. However, she also argues for obedience to the King. In 1683 Dole contributed to A Salutation of my Endeared Love by the fellow Quaker sectary Elizabeth Stirredge, and in 1684 published a work of her own under the same title, which was reprinted two years later.

== External source ==
- Copies of Dole's pamphlets are available in the British Library.
