= Dorothy White =

English Quaker pamphleteer (c.1630–1686)

Dorothy White (c. 1630–1686) was an English Quaker and writer of religious pamphlets. These give useful information on Quaker beliefs at that time, for instance, in relation to the Inner Light.

== Life and work ==
Born probably at Weymouth, Dorset, White wrote her first pamphlet, A Diligent Search amongst Rulers, Priests, Professors, and People in May 1659, seemingly for local distribution. It was radical in tone: "All you high and loughty [lofty] ones, you fruitless branches, you will the Lord cut down with the Sword of his power." It also describes how Dorothy White was briefly imprisoned for interrupting a local Anglican service. It was printed in the same year.

Another early pamphlet was A Lamentation unto this Nation; and also a warning to all people, etc. A pamphlet entitled A Trumpet Sounded Out of the Holy City... appeared in 1662, when Quakers and others were suffering renewed persecution under laws requiring conformity with the Church of England. It draws particularly on the later chapters of Isaiah and on the book of Revelation. These works provide useful insight into Quaker beliefs in the period. Some of White's writings were in verse, for instance on the nature of what would be called today the Inner Light: "We must be subject unto Light within,/Wherein is known the Cleansing from all Sin;/Subject unto Christ, the Light alone,/Unto the Lamb that sitteth on the Throne;/To the Light within at first we were direct;/The way to Life, Sin to reject:/The True Light we must always obey,/Christ the Life, the New and Living Way/..."

White's earlier activity came at a time when the Quakers were ahead of other sects in assigning roles for women in their movement. This brought added persecution that continued in some forms into the 18th century.

== Reappearance ==
After a silence of twenty years, White reappeared in 1684 with several appeals to the Quakers not to reduce their radicalism. It has also been suggested that she was inactive as a Quaker during that period. The renewed appeals included A Salutation of Love to all the Tender-Hearted, Universal Love to the Lost and The Day Dawned both to Jews and Gentiles, the latter another mixture of prose and poetry. She is said to have been the most prolific female Quaker pamphleteer of the 17th century, contributing twenty texts.

Some authors have speculated that Dorothy White married John Fincham (died 1711), a rich Norfolk Quaker, but the Dorothy White who became his bride on 12 March 1681 came from Thetford, while the pamphleteer Dorothy White still wrote after that date under her maiden name. Dorothy White died in Cripplegate, London of a fever on 6 February 1686.

== See also ==
- Valiant Sixty
- History of the Religious Society of Friends
- Quaker views on women
