= Roger C. Wilson =

American composer

Roger C. Wilson (April 25, 1912 – October 11, 1988) was an American composer of church music active from about 1940 until about 1975. His works were frequently included in Lorenz Publishing's serials during this era, and many were subsequently anthologized.

Some of his compositions were attributed pseudonymously to either Benton Price, Walter Price, Stewart Landon, Lee Rogers, Harold West, or Thomas Ahrens.
