= Ecotourism in Costa Rica =

Nature tourism

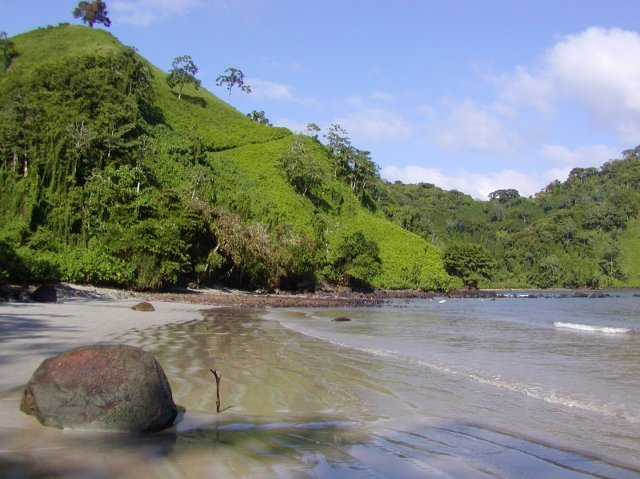
Cocos Island is a prime ecotourism destination in Costa Rica. A World Heritage Site, ranked among the top 77 nominees for the New 7 Wonders of Nature.

Ecotourism is a key component of the tourism industry in Costa Rica. By the early 1990s, Costa Rica became known as the poster child of ecotourism. The country is among many developing nations that look to ecotourism as a way of cashing in on the growing demand for this popular trend of travel.

Ecotourism draws many tourists to visit the extensive national parks and protected areas around the country. Costa Rica was a pioneer in this type of tourism, and the country is recognized as one of the few with true ecotourism. While Costa Rica has gained immense popularity for its development of a successful, yet environmentally friendly, ecotourism industry, environmentalists and economists alike debate whether an economy centered on tourism produces more good than harm.

== Current situation ==
With its rich biodiversity and immense ecosystem, ecotourism in Costa Rica leads the ranks in this category of tourism. The country takes advantage of the growing demand for eco-tourists to visit these protected areas in exchange for profit. For years, growth in tourism in Central America was extremely slow due to civil wars in various regions; however, as peace developed in neighboring countries, tourism in Costa Rica has skyrocketed over the past two decades.

Many of the first ecotourists were academics who came to the country to study biology. The publications generated by of these biologists, coupled with a more aggressive campaign by the Costa Rican Tourism Board (ICT), soon led to a growing group of "nature tourists." By 1995, more than 800,000 foreigners came to Costa Rica, many of whom visited national parks and reserves. The tourism boom began in 1987, with the number of visitors up from 329,000 in 1988, through 1.03 million in 1999, to a historical record of 2.34 million foreign visitors in 2012. In 2012 international tourist receipts reached US$2.4 billion. The country is ranked fifth in the world, and first among the Americas, in terms of the 2012 Environmental Performance Index.

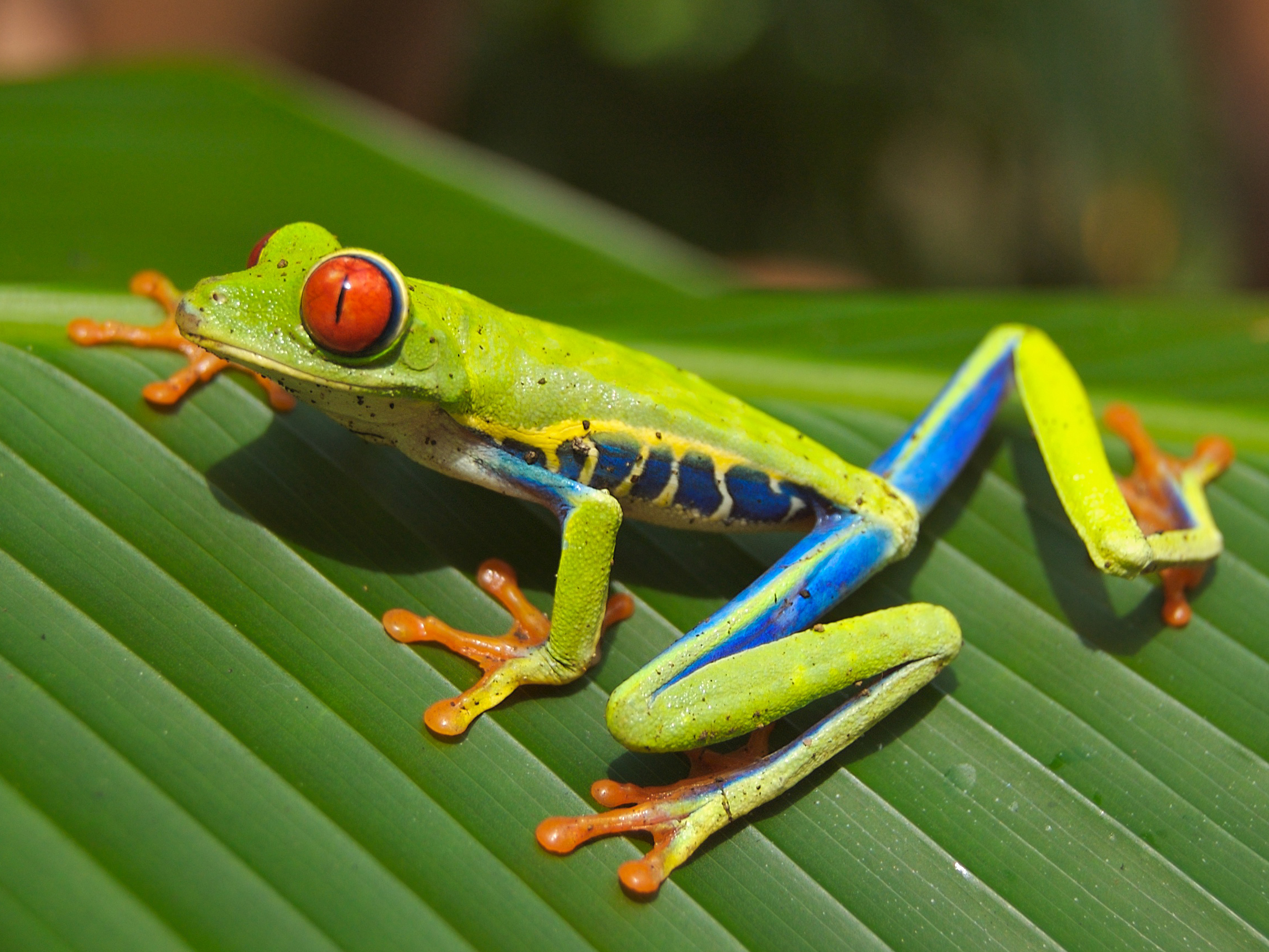
Costa Rica's biodiversity is an asset for ecotourism. A notable frog species is the red-eyed tree frog.

=== Location ===
Due to Costa Rica’s position on the world stage, a significant amount of the nation's success in the ecotourism sector can be attributed to its proximity to the United States. In addition, American travelers make up 20% of the world’s tourism market; Costa Rica is an ideal place for Americans to visit. With its favourable climate and advantageous access by the North American market, it illustrates why 49% of foreign visitors come from the United States and another 9% of visitors come from Canada and Mexico. Expatriate American entrepreneurs such as Jim Damalas, Jack Ewing and Michael Kaye were also prominent in building the sector during the late twentieth century.

=== Higher standard of living ===
In comparison to other undeveloped regions in the world, Costa Rica ranks relatively high in terms of standard of living. With its high growth rates, economic stability and low crime rates, Costa Rica maintains a per ca-pita GDP of $11,700, literacy rate of 95%, and female life expectancy of nearly 79 years. When comparing Costa Rica to other leading countries in the ecotourism sector, the differences on these indicators are significantly greater. As Julie Dasenbrock put it: “Costa Rica offers a look at a way of life distinct from the modernized world, while allowing tourists to largely avoid the sad realities of poverty in the Third World”.

=== Local people ===
The rise of ecotourism in Costa Rica over the past decade has resulted in an extensive expansion in the job market. This has allowed local citizens to generate income and employment, at both the national and local levels: the ecotourism industry has offered residents almost double the monthly income compared to other employment opportunities. Local communities and schools have received significant amounts of investment and donations from visitors, as a result of this expansion, consequently helping to modernize the living conditions endured by the local people. Unfortunately, it cannot be said that all citizens feel as though they have reaped the benefits of a successful economy, as some Costa Ricans “view the growth of tourism as the ‘kidnapping of a nation’ in which they have no say or opportunities to get involved".

== Effects on the environment ==
=== Benefits ===
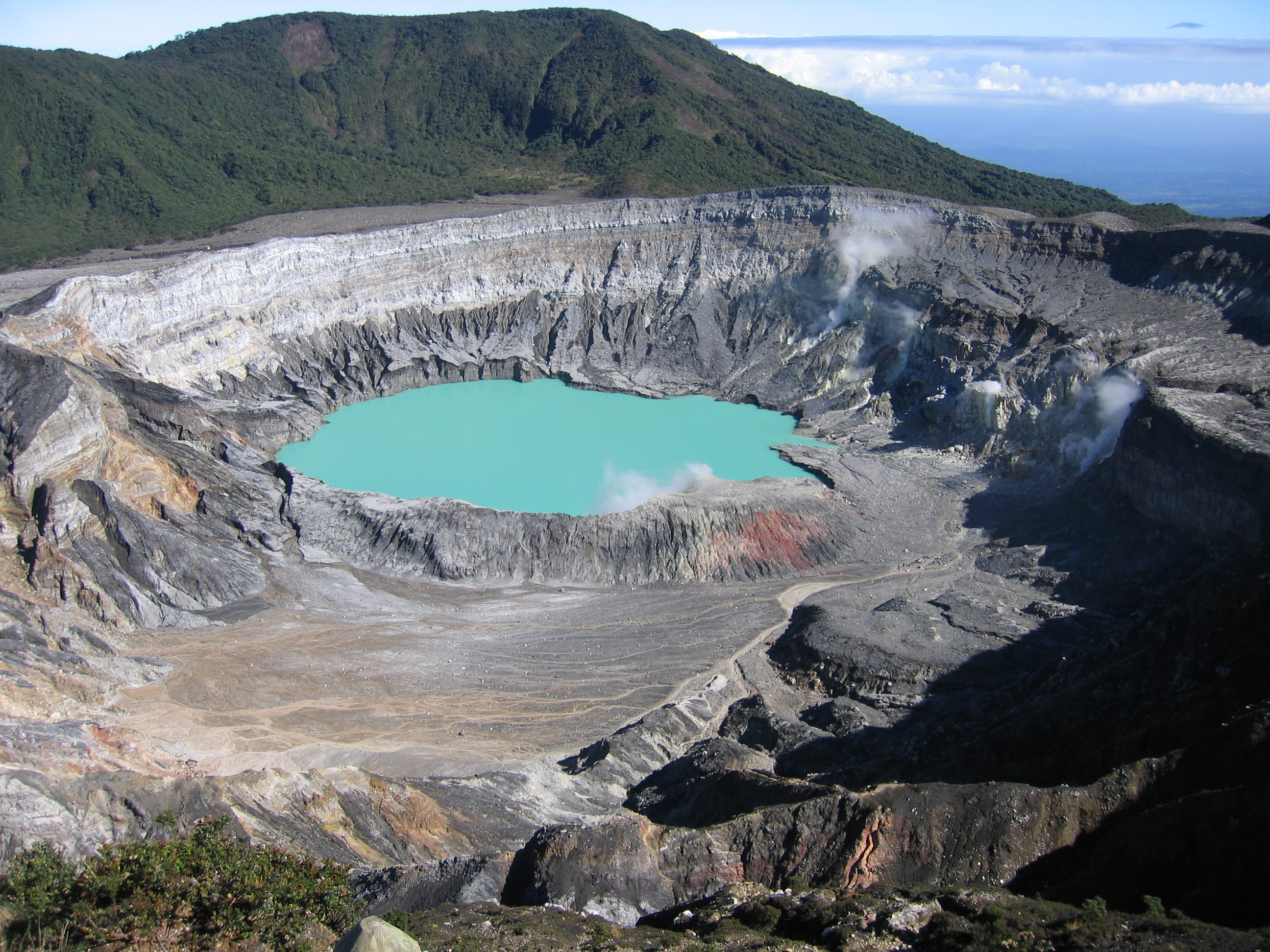
Poás Volcano Crater is one of the country's main tourist attractions.

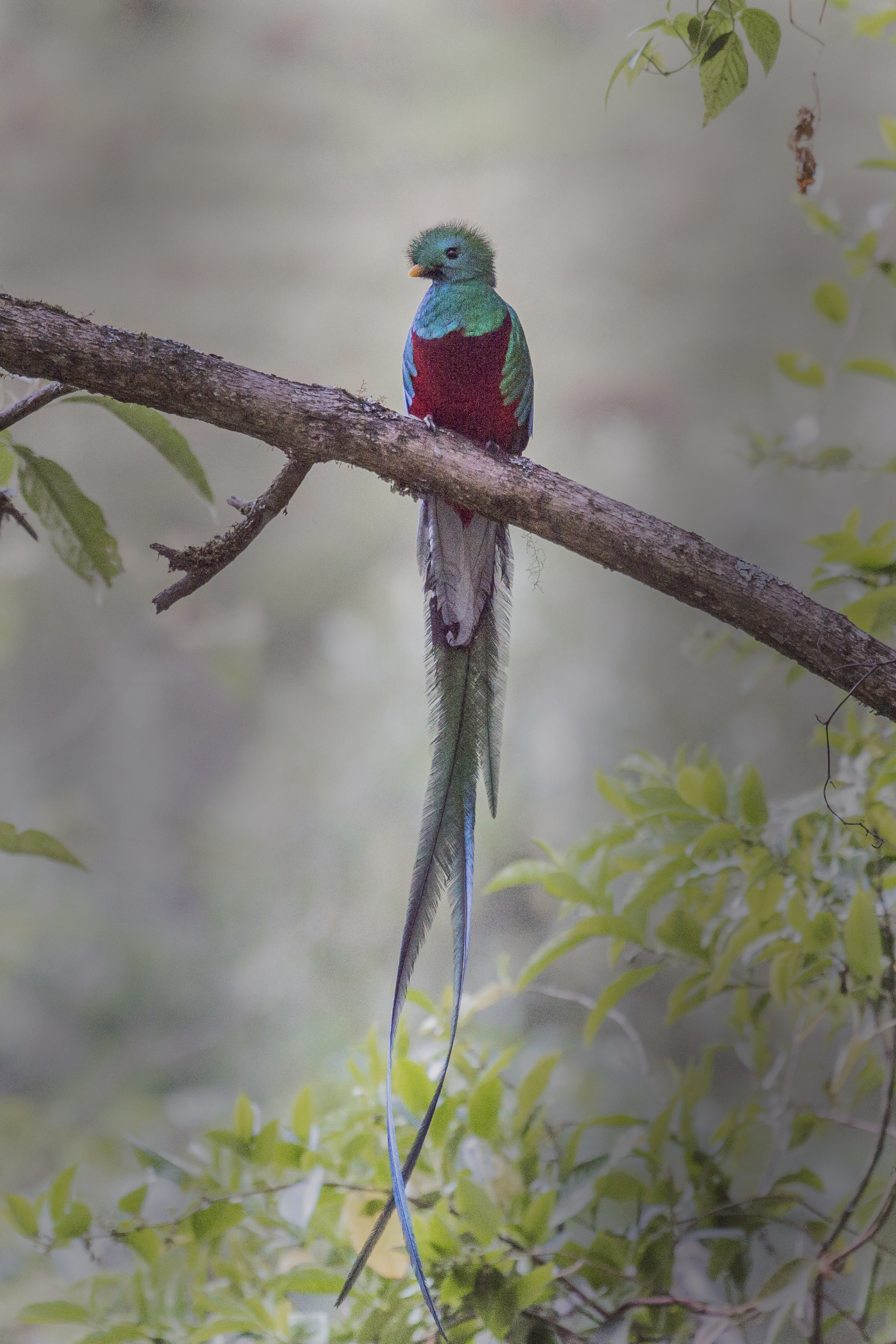
Birdwatching tours to observe the resplendent quetzal are common in Costa Rica's cloud forests.

The environmental benefits of ecotourism in Costa Rica have been far reaching. Initially, this was not the case, but over time ecotourism has come to be seen as a way to preserve natural areas throughout Costa Rica. The interpretation of ecotourism, as a means to conservation, has resulted in various initiatives. The rapid expansion of Costa Rica's national park system in the 1970s and its expansion to include 70 protected areas covering 21% of the nation's territory make up some of these initiatives. Thus, ecotourism has provided greater incentives for natural resource conservation in the form of state-protected areas and private lands. With nearly ½ million acres of land designated as protected areas, tourism in Costa Rica has surged, with scientific and nature tourists from around the world converging on this naturally endowed paradise for tourists.

Natural resource conservation has been especially on the rise as ecotourism has acted as an alternative to environmentally damaging industries. Without the market demand and political support for environmental protection, currently protected areas may have fallen to the demands of farming, logging, or mining industries long ago.

Ecotourism in Costa Rica also encourages individual conservation efforts based on the individual eco-tourist. Ecotourism is meant to both educate and entertain travellers. Thus, “by experiencing first hand the beauty of the Monteverde Cloud Forest Reserve or the majesty of a Red Macaw, tourists may return home wanting to do more to help protect the environment.” Informed tour guides and educational pamphlets can incite tourists to become environmentalists, thereby promoting conservation efforts worldwide.

=== Costs ===
Ecotourism has contributed significantly to Costa Rica – as both a country and an economy. However, it is also a prime example of ‘ecotourism gone wrong’. In the initial stages of ecotourism in Costa Rica, all stakeholders benefitted from this type of tourism and attention was being paid to the conservation of nature because of the amount of money that was flowing into the country as a result of it. However, as the amount of profit from ecotourism started to rise, the matters of protection of local environment and nature became secondary issues with all the attention focused on profit maximization.

Visitor overcapacity is one of the biggest threats to Costa Rica’s natural environments. Although policies in Costa Rica direct eco-tourists into areas designated specifically for that purpose, thereby alleviating the pressure on other more fragile environments, the fact is that even the ecotourism designated environments are becoming more and more fragile. That reality is precisely one of the reasons so many people converge to such areas; they cannot experience such unadulterated nature in their own countries.

Inadequate enforcement, including limited finances, inadequate local expertise and corruption, has contributed significantly to passive conservation efforts. Oftentimes, because developing nations do not have the resources to train the personnel necessary to efficiently regulate and protect a national park, it results in the progression of environmental degradation to which no one can be held accountable. For example, “44% of the 3.2 million acres marked for protection remain in the hands of their previous residents and owners. Logging in these areas is often hard to detect or prevent leading some to argue that Costa Rica's natural resources are protected only on paper” (Dulude, 2000). There are extreme shortages in the amount of money necessary to support adequate park management, infrastructure, and programming. Lack of funding, in this respect, has led to problems such as trail deterioration, habitat disruption, pollution, and litter becoming more common.

== Effects on the economy ==
=== Benefits ===
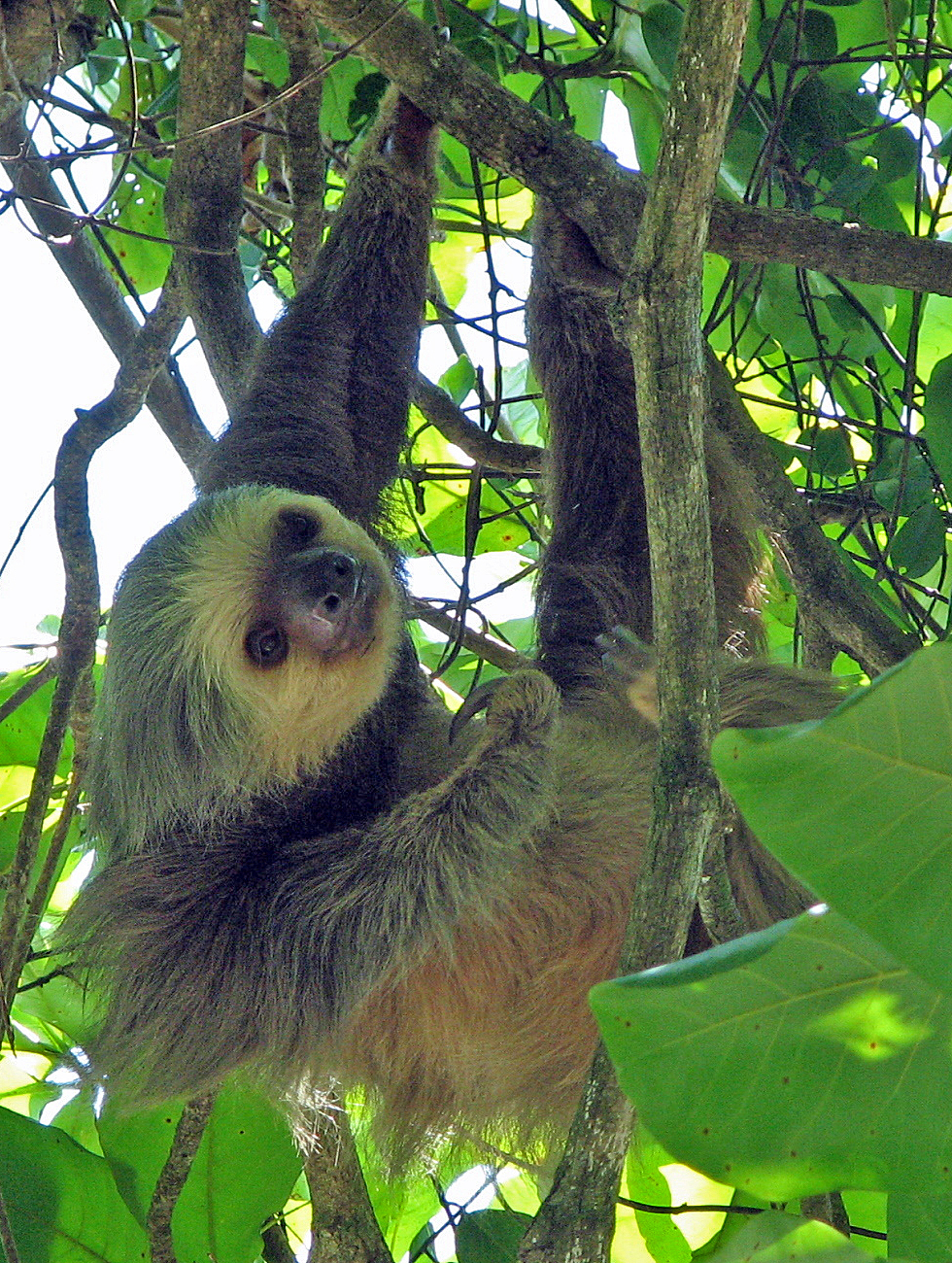
Two-toed sloth in Manuel Antonio National Park.

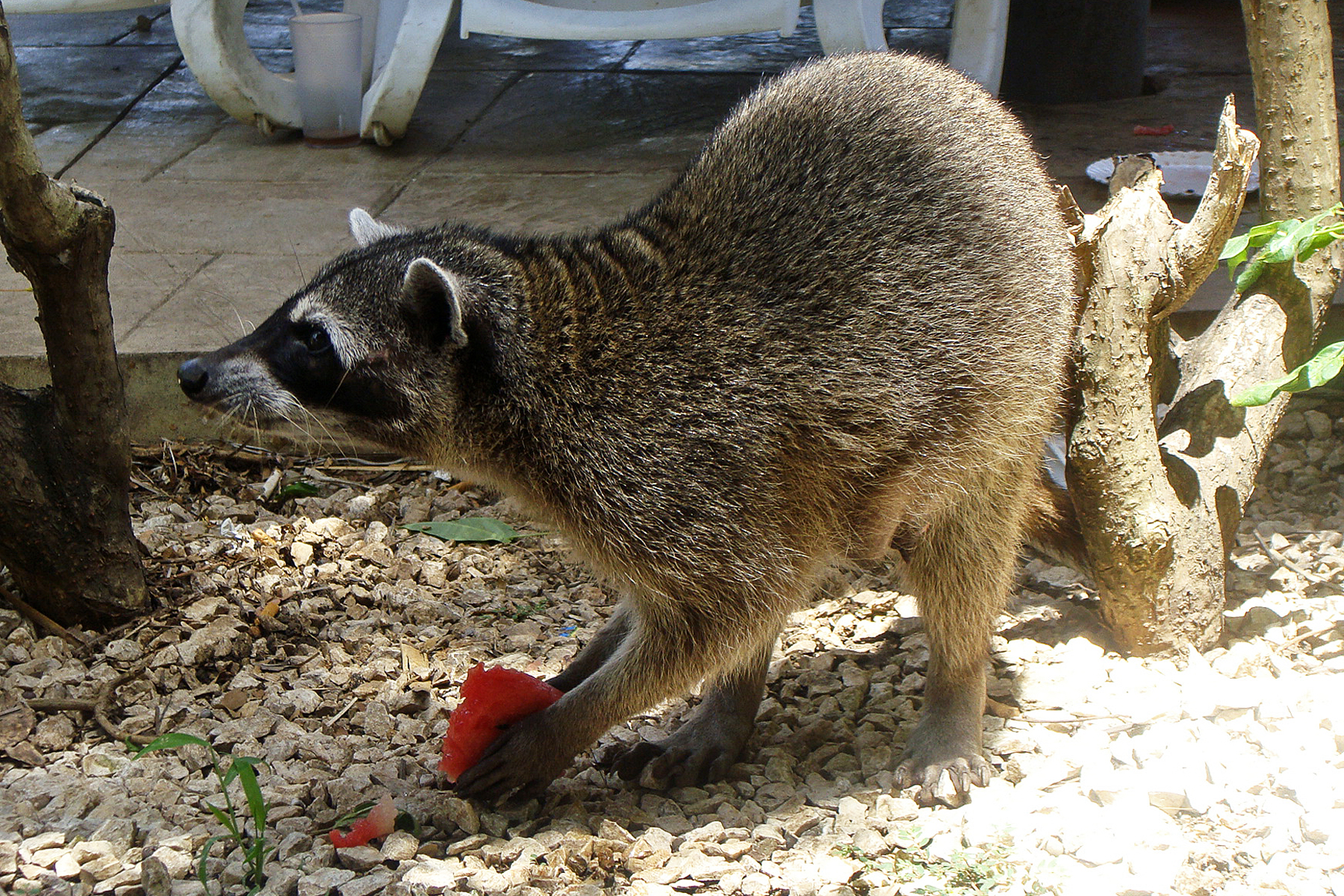
Crab-eating raccoon wandering on a beach resort from the nearby Las Baulas National Marine Park.

Costa Rica has turned to ecotourism as its key to economic development. Since 1984, international tourism receipts have grown from $117 million to $136 million in 1987, and $577 million in 1993. Such phenomenal growth has made tourism the leading source of foreign exchange in Costa Rica.

The growth linkage possibilities of ecotourism development have had, consequently, far reaching effects on other sectors of the economy. For example, “a visit to the Carara Biological Reserve entails not only a $15 entrance fee and possible additional donation, but also a flight into San José's International Airport, a bus ride to the park, a stay in a local hotel, dining in the town's restaurants, and the purchase of souvenirs from street vendors” (TED). To this extent, the ecotourism industry has had a trickle-down effect, bringing added revenues to rural and previously disadvantaged areas.

Less obvious growth linkages of ecotourism can affect everything from the communications industry to agriculture. The successes of Costa Rica's ecotourism industry have also helped breathe life into the nation's sagging coffee market. Tourists consume an average of two cups of the nation's gourmet coffee a day adding up to approximately 22 million cups of coffee a year, which, at 75 cents per cup, brings in about $16.5 million. Therefore, as many Latin American nations are losing jobs and revenue to falling coffee prices caused by an influx of cheaper Asian brands into the market, Costa Rica has managed to stay afloat with this increase in domestic consumption.

With a rise in ecotourism and benefits to other industries, locals were relocated and logging industries shut down and Costa Ricans were able to turn to the tourism industry for employment. This would not have been possible if Costa Rica had adhered to former protectionist measures that tended to wall off protected areas from the public.

Ecotourism in Costa Rica has also helped “diversity the national economy, which previously depended upon the exportation of a few agricultural products, namely coffee, bananas, meat, and sugar, for 65% of its exports.” Like many countries in Central America, Costa Rica's small internal market and scarcity of raw materials make industrialization a slow and difficult process without much room for expansion.

=== Costs ===
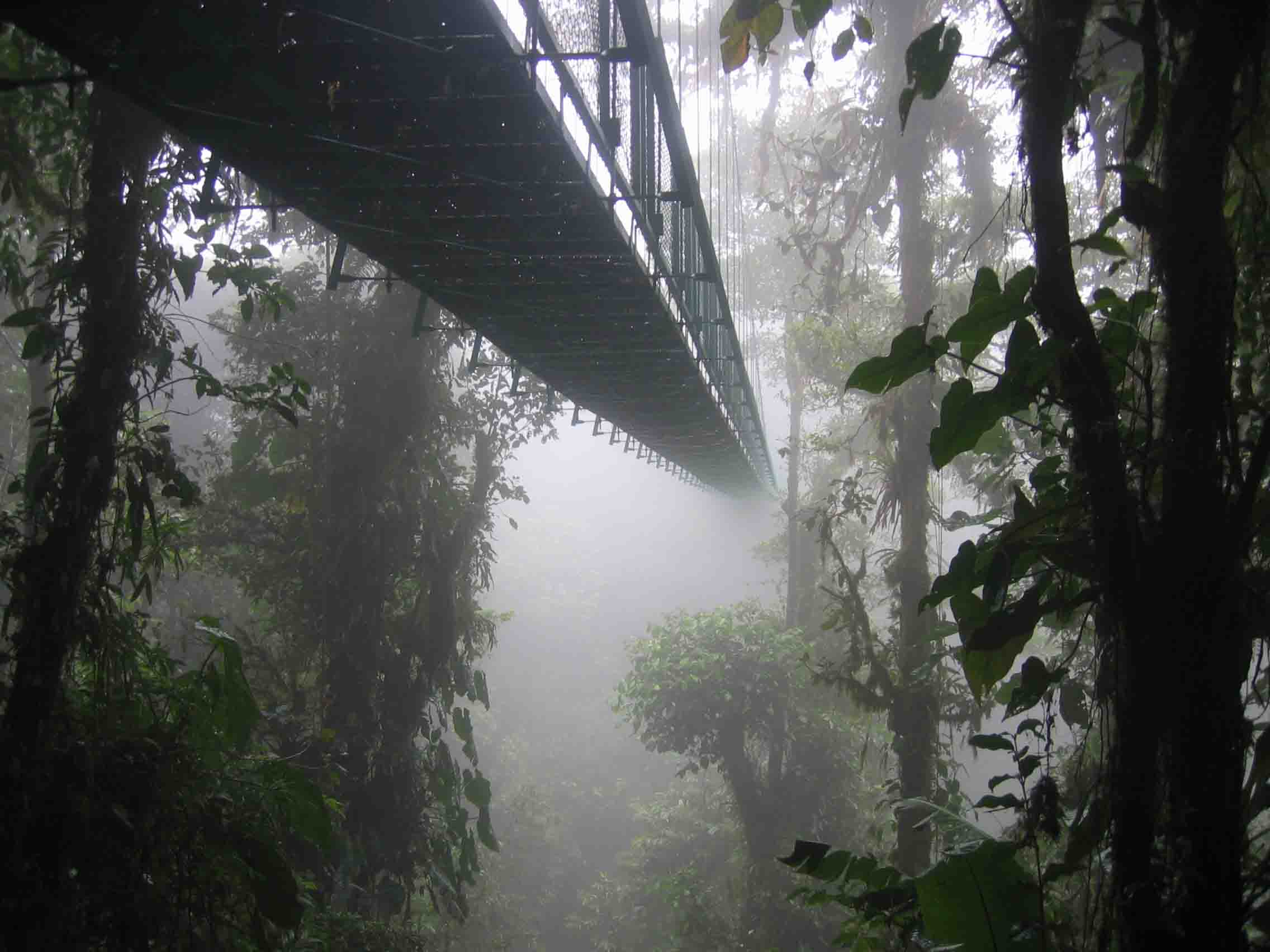
Canopy walkway in the cloud forest in Santa Elena, Costa Rica

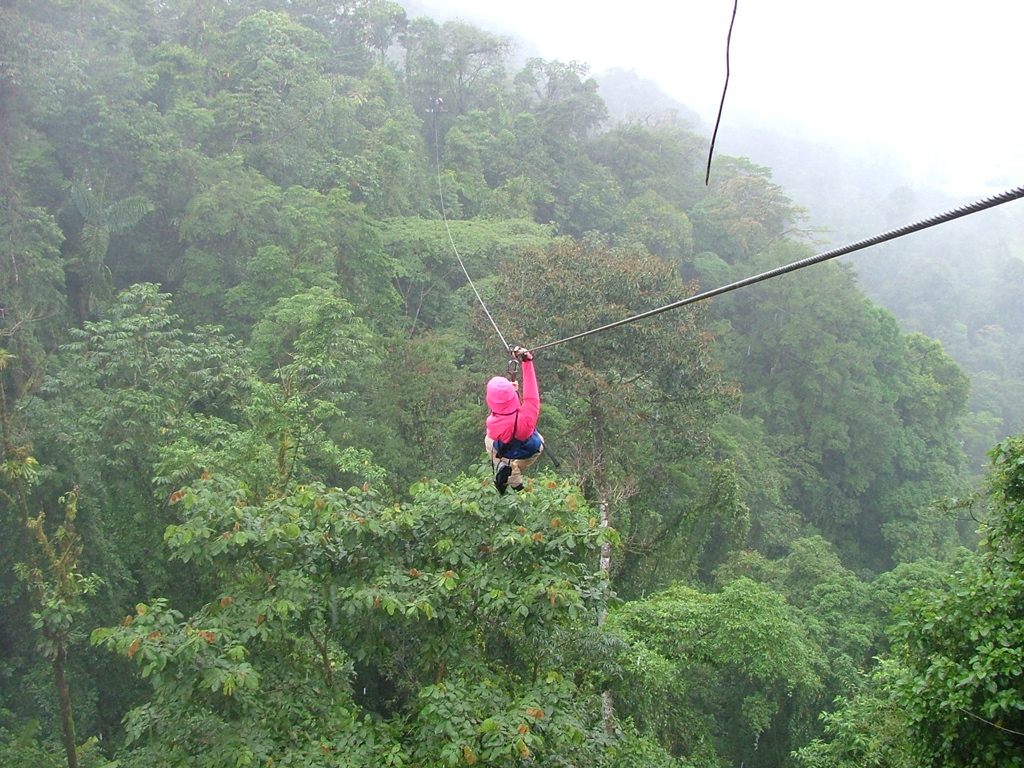
Zip line in the cloud forest near Arenal Volcano

Ecotourism can be source of generating economic development at a local level; however, quite often, it has also resulted in the disruption of local economic activities. As history has shown, ecotourism has not only disrupted local economic activity, but oftentimes, the economic benefits of ecotourism in a particular area do not accrue to the local community. Instead of locals being compensated for switching to professions in the tourism industry, they oftentimes receive jobs that are low paying (although better paying than farming) and limited in their potential for upward mobility as managerial positions go to foreigners or urban-educated elites.

Profit leakage and exploitation are other possible factors that could affect the economic viability of Costa Rica tremendously in the future. Many developing nations do not have the resources to construct the infrastructure necessary for tourism development, which leads them to turn to foreign corporations and international donors (Hicks, 2001). The widespread involvement of foreign investors can lead to a leakage problem in which the profits earned by the tourism sector do not stay in the country (Hicks, 2001). This case has been seen to unfold in Costa Rica, where investment is low but new infrastructure is needed, leaving the government no other choice but to resort to foreign aid.

== Potential solutions ==
The key to a successful ecotourism industry in Costa Rica, which must prevail in all of its individual facets, comes down to better implementation, monitoring and evaluation around the region. In detail, “there needs to be the establishment of a system that considers all aspects of ecotourism ranging from the biophysical to the social”. The complexities surrounding a successful ecotourism industry cannot be understood or solved overnight as there are numerous stakeholders involved and various opinions to take into consideration; there must be a mutual understanding amongst all parties involved as to what a successful ecotourism industry looks like. With that said, more scientific studies related to the biodiversity of the parks, habitat and its disruption, park carrying capacities, pollution, visitation, and other similar issues will need to be conducted.

There is no standard set of guidelines for ecotourism; it is vital that the government of Costa Rica works alongside certification programs to ensure a prosperous environment and economy for the sake of the nation’s future. To illustrate, “the lack of certification poses a significant problem, for it means that ecolodges and other establishments are not answerable as far as the extent and success of their environmental efforts. Recycling programs, promotion of low-impact tourist activities, and support for conservation efforts are entirely voluntary once minimum existing environmental standards have been met”.

== See also ==
- Camino de Costa Rica (long hiking trail across Costa Rica)
- List of national parks of Costa Rica
- Tourism in Costa Rica
- Conservation in Costa Rica
- Wildlife of Costa Rica
