= Elizabeth Stirredge =

Elizabeth Stirredge (1634–1706) was a Christian author. She was the author of Strength in weakness manifest in the life, trials and Christian testimony of that faithful servant and handmaid of the Lord. Stirredge was a Quaker. She died in Hempsted, aged 72.
