= Article 12 of the Constitution of Costa Rica =

Clause abolishing the permanent army

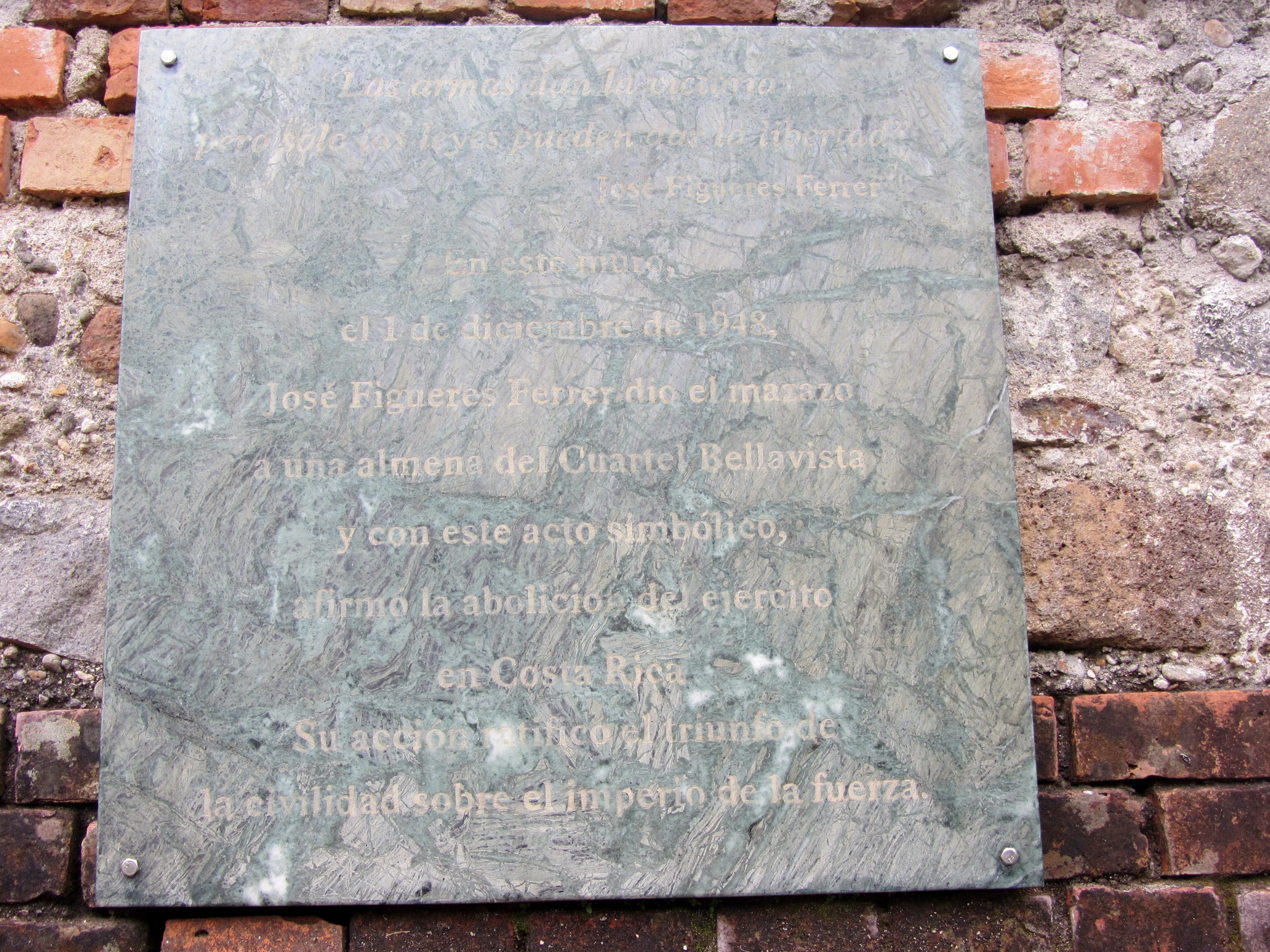
Memorial plaque of the Article in the National Museum

Article 12 of the Constitution of Costa Rica abolishes Costa Rica's army as a permanent institution, making Costa Rica one of the first countries in the world to do so as the current Constitution was enacted in 1949. Costa Rica is one of the few countries without armed forces and, alongside Panama, one of the few that is not a microstate. However, like Panama, Costa Rica does have limited military capacities with its Public Forces which have both police and defense functions and have taken part in military operations since 1949.

The article does not completely abolish the army; it only establishes that the army cannot be a permanent standing organization. The article does establish that Costa Rica may create an army for national defense or for international cooperation, but also clarifies that it will always be submitted to civilian authority.

The date of the abolition of the army (1 December) is celebrated annually in Costa Rica as a national holiday.

== Text of the article ==
Se proscribe el Ejército como institución permanente. Para la vigilancia y conservación del orden público, habrá las fuerzas de policía necesarias. Sólo por convenio continental o para la defensa nacional podrán organizarse fuerzas militares; unas y otras estarán siempre subordinadas al poder civil; no podrán deliberar, ni hacer manifestaciones o declaraciones en forma individual o colectiva.

English translation according to the site CostaRicanLaw.com:

The Army as a permanent institution is abolished. There shall be the necessary police forces for surveillance and the preservation of the public order. Military forces may only be organized under a continental agreement or for the national defense; in either case, they shall always be subordinate to the civil power: they may not deliberate or make statements or representations individually or collectively.

== Historical background ==
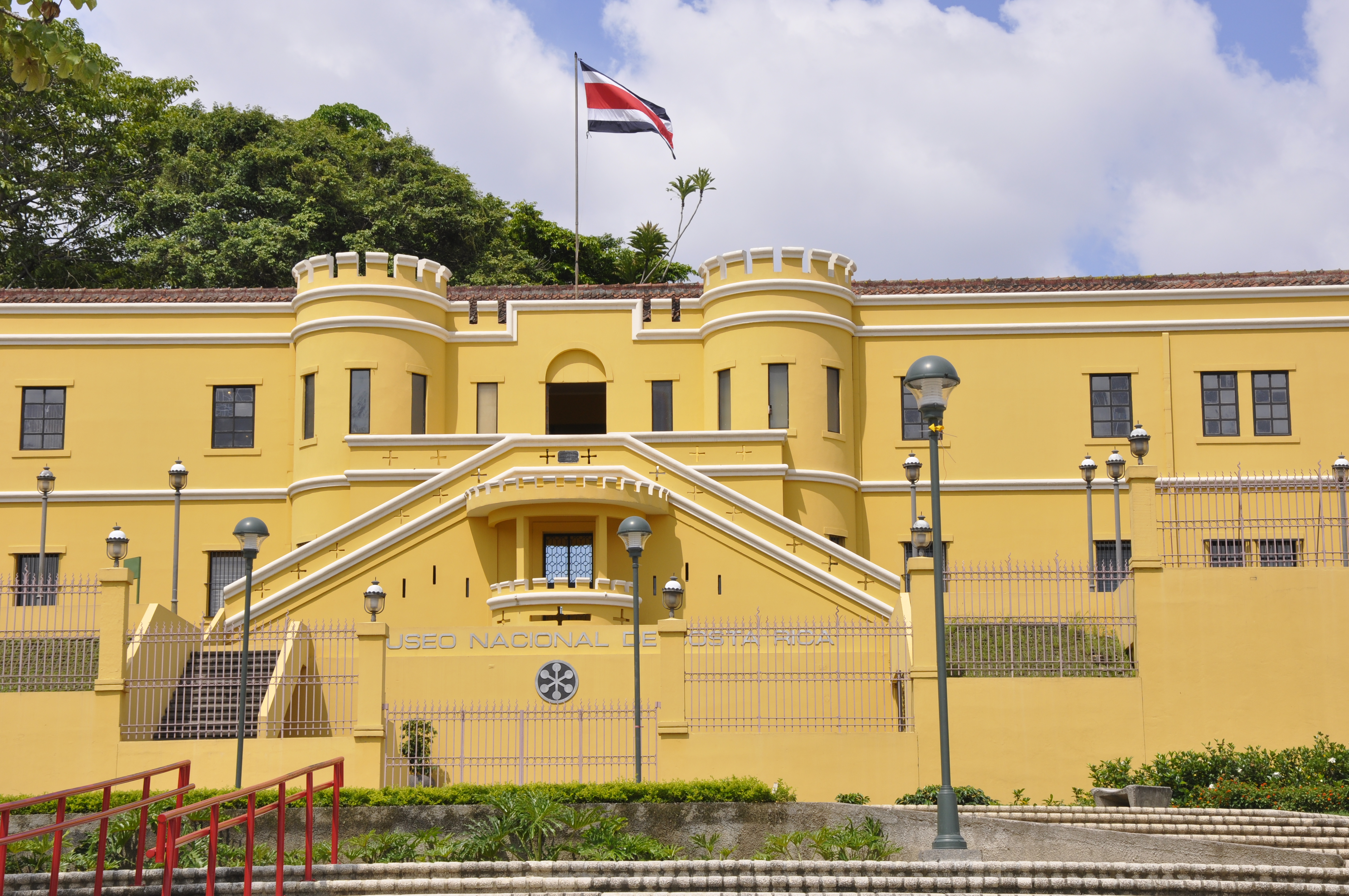
Cuartel Bellavista, today Museo Nacional de Costa Rica.

Costa Rica's army was abolished soon after the end of the 1948 civil war by decision of the Constituent Assembly and the enactment of the Constitution on 31 October 1949. Costa Rica's Army headquarters, the Cuartel Bellavista in the capital San José, is transferred to the University of Costa Rica and is where currently Museo Nacional de Costa Rica is located.

Although several figures have claimed authorship of the idea, generally the victorious caudillo of the war José Figueres Ferrer is credited for its abolishing. Whilst some critics point his motivations more as an effort to avoid an impending coup (and indeed Costa Rica hasn't had a coup since 1949, something unusual for the region), others reasons have been signaled including the fact that the army at the time was primarily composed of foreign mercenaries from the Caribbean Legion or that it was obsolete and an unnecessary use of resources that were redirected on education and healthcare.

Despite this, Costa Ricans in general show pride for this event and the country has a very rooted pacifist and anti-militarist culture.

== Criticism ==
Criticism about the issue are split generally into two camps. On one side critics mostly on the left of the spectrum question the effectiveness of the measure and believe that Costa Rica's abolition of the army was in name only, and that Costa Rica still in effect has a pseudo-military in the Public Forces, which they claim are used both for internal repression, and also for both domestic and international US-led military operations.

The opposite criticism come mostly from far-right circles who question the decision of not having an army and advocate for its re-installment.
