= Cadbury (surname) =

Cadbury is a surname, and may refer to:

- Adrian Cadbury (1929–2015), English businessman
- Beatrice Boeke-Cadbury (1884–1976), English-Dutch social activist, educator and Quaker missionary, daughter of Richard Cadbury
- Deborah Cadbury, British author, historian and television producer
- Dik Cadbury, English musician and singer
- Dominic Cadbury (born 1940), English businessman
- Dorothy Adlington Cadbury (1892–1987), English botanist and company director
- Edward Cadbury (1873–1948), British chairman of Cadbury Brothers, business theorist and philanthropist
- Egbert Cadbury (1893–1967), English First World War flying ace and managing director of Cadbury's
- Elizabeth Cadbury (1858–1951), British activist, politician and philanthropist, wife of George Cadbury
- Elizabeth Cadbury-Brown (1922–2002), American-British architect
- George Cadbury (1839–1922), English chocolate manufacturer
- George Cadbury Jr (1878–1954), British chairman of Cadbury, business theorist and philanthropist, son of George Cadbury
- Geraldine Cadbury (1864–1941), British author and reformer
- Henry Cadbury (1883–1974), American religious scholar
- H. T. Cadbury-Brown (1913–2009), English architect
- Jocelyn Cadbury (1946–1982), British Conservative Party politician
- John Cadbury (1801–1889), English founder of the Cadbury company
- Peter Cadbury (1918–2006), English entrepreneur
- Richard Cadbury (1835–1899), English manufacturer and philanthropist
- Richard Tapper Cadbury (1768–1860), English draper
- Ruth Cadbury (born 1959), English Labour Party politician
- William Adlington Cadbury (1867–1957), English businessman
- William Warder Cadbury (1877–1959), American physician, author and medical missionary.
