= Cadbury family =

Prominent British family of Quaker industrialists

The Cadbury family is a British family of wealthy Quaker industrialists descending from Richard Tapper Cadbury.

- Richard Tapper Cadbury (1768–1860), draper and abolitionist, who financed his sons' start-up business; married Elizabeth Head
  - John Cadbury (1801–1889), Quaker, family patriarch and founder of the Cadbury chocolate company working with two brothers; married firstly Priscilla Ann Dymond (1799–1828) and they had no children; married secondly Candia Barrow (1805–1855) with whom he had seven children
    - John Cadbury (1834–1866)
    - Richard Cadbury (1835–1899), manufacturer and philanthropist; married Elizabeth Adlington
      - Barrow Cadbury (1862–1958), head of the chocolate factory, founder of the Barrow Cadbury Trust; married Geraldine Cadbury
        - Dorothy Adlington Cadbury (1892–1987), director of Cadbury and botanist. Her name appears on the side of tubs of Cadbury Roses chocolates.
        - Paul Cadbury (1895–1984), chair of the Barrow Cadbury Trust from 1958 until his death in 1984
          - Charles Lloyd Cadbury (1926–2000), director of Barrow Cadbury Fund from 1992 until his death
            - Ruth Margaret Cadbury (born 1959), Labour MP for Brentford & Isleworth since 2015
      - William Adlington Cadbury (1867–1957); married Emmeline Hannah Wilson
        - George Corbyn Barrow (1903–1998), lawyer and Lord Mayor of Birmingham
      - Beatrice Boeke-Cadbury (1884–1976); married Kees Boeke
      - Edith Butler-Cadbury (1872–1951)
    - Maria Cadbury (1838–1908)
    - George Cadbury (1839–1922), younger brother, developed the firm; married firstly Mary Tylor (died 1887); married secondly Elizabeth Mary Taylor (1858–1951)
      - Edward Cadbury, (1873–1948), head of the chocolate factory, founder of the Edward and Dorothy Cadbury Charitable Trust; married Dorothy Howitt (1872–1950)
      - George Cadbury Jr (1878–1954), chairman of Cadbury, developed the recipe for Cadbury Dairy Milk.
      - Mary Isabel Cadbury (1884–1975); married Kenneth Henry Wilson (born 1885)
      - Eleanor Cadbury (1885–1959); married Bertram Fothergill Crosfield (1882–1951), managing director of daily newspaper The News Chronicle and The Star
      - Laurence John Cadbury (1889–1982), succeeded his brother Edward as head of the chocolate company in 1944; married Joyce Mathews
        - Sir Adrian Hayhurst Cadbury (1929–2015), chairman of Cadbury and Cadbury Schweppes for 24 years, director of the Bank of England, Olympic rower, and chancellor of Aston University; married Gillian Skepper; married secondly Susan Sinclair
        - Sir Dominic Cadbury (born 1940), businessman, Chancellor of the University of Birmingham; married Cecilia Sarah Symes
        - Jocelyn Cadbury (1946–1982), Conservative MP for Birmingham Northfield, 1979–1982
      - George Norman Cadbury (1890 - 1980)
      - Elsie Dorothea Cadbury (1892–1972); Voluntary Aid Detachment nurse during World War I
      - Sir Egbert Cadbury (1893–1967), First World War fighter pilot, later managing director of the family firm; married Mary Forbes Phillips (1895–1968)
        - Peter Egbert Cadbury (1918–2006), entrepreneur; married firstly Benedicta Bruce; married secondly Jennifer Hammond-Maude; married thirdly Jane Mead
          - Joel Cadbury, one-time owner of the Groucho Club
        - George Patric Lucas Cadbury (1920–1941)
      - Marion Janet Cadbury (1894–1979); politician, married William Greeves (1890–1960)
    - Joseph Cadbury (1841–1841)
    - Edward Cadbury (1843–1866)
    - Henry Cadbury (1845–1875)
- Richard Cadbury Barrow (1827–1894), merchant
