= Selly Oak Colleges =

Ecumenical federation of colleges

Selly Oak Colleges was a federation of educational facilities which in the 1970s and 1980s was at the forefront of debates about ecumenism - the coming together of Christian churches and the creation of new united churches such as the Church of South India; the relationships between Christianity and other religions, especially Islam and Judaism; child-centred teacher training; and the theology of Christian mission. It was located on a substantial campus in Selly Oak, a suburb in the south-west of Birmingham, England, about a mile from the University of Birmingham. In 2001 the largest college, Westhill College, whose main work was the training of teachers, passed into the hands of the University of Birmingham, and most of the remaining colleges closed, leaving Woodbrooke College, a study and conference centre for the Society of Friends, and Fircroft College, a small adult education college with residential provision. Woodbrooke college closed in 2023 and management of the building was transferred to the Bournville Village Trust.

== History ==
Woodbrooke College was founded in 1903 by George Cadbury and other local members of the Society of Friends, (or Quakers), in one of the former properties of George Cadbury, whose father John created the chocolate-making company Cadbury. The society did not have salaried clergy, or professional training for its leaders. So the college was set up to provide its lay leaders with good knowledge of Quaker traditions and of Christian theology, and Christian responses to social questions. It was not an official institution of the Society of Friends, but it had the active support of many Quakers on both sides of the Atlantic.

Kingsmead College was founded in 1905 by the Friends' Foreign Mission Association, for the training of women missionaries. From 1915 Methodists came to the college, and Methodist influence and commitment increased, until in 1946 it came under Methodist control. In 1960 it became the centre for the training of all Methodist missionary candidates from the UK and a place that they could return to when they returned home on leave.

Westhill College (1907) was also begun by Quakers, at first to train Sunday school teachers with, from 1912, a governing body which included representatives from the main Free Churches in the UK. Its work expanded to train youth and community workers, and it became a pioneering training college for primary and infants school teachers. Its teacher training stressed the importance of child-centred education, especially for young children, on the principles of Friedrich Fröbel (1782-1852), and Christian education. Its students, and those at the other colleges, were able to study for its certificates in education, youth and community work, and religious education.

Fircroft College (1909), influenced by the Danish Folk High Schools, was founded as a residential college for working men, to broaden their outlook and to increase their self-confidence. It maintained close links with UK trade unions, and the Workers Educational Association.

Attracted by Kingsmead, three Free Church mission agencies (Baptist, Congregationalist and Presbyterian) jointly founded Carey Hall (1912) as a training college for women missionaries.

== The Federation ==
In 1919 the controlling bodies of these five colleges agreed to work together, and to establish a Central Council. They differed in style and ethos, each was independently organised, but all were Christian in inspiration with interests in:

1. education as personal development and preparation for service rather than for academic qualifications and professional advancement - lay Christianity in Woodbrooke, Sunday school teaching in Westhill, citizenship in Fircroft;
2. the training of teachers - for Church-related education in Westhill; this concern was shared by the missionary colleges;
3. theology studied ecumenically by ordinary Christians, mostly lay, as an academic subject but also within the context of Christian commitment;
4. social studies - students who chose to do so could work for internally awarded certificates or diplomas, or a University of Birmingham Social Studies Diploma;
5. the wider world. There was an international dimension in all the colleges, not merely because many students were expecting to work overseas but also because many came from overseas, unusual in the Britain of that time.

In 1923 the Anglican SPG Society for the Propagation of the Gospel founded the College of the Ascension initially for the training of women missionaries, and in 1926 the Young Women's Christian Association established the YWCA College. In 1925 Fircroft produced a rural offshoot, Avoncroft, on a site in the Worcestershire countryside, about 12 miles from Selly Oak. The creation of Crowther Hall in 1969 by the Church Missionary Society meant that all the major Protestant missionary societies, including both high church and low church Anglicanism were on the site. Prospect Hall was created in 1978 to assist in the rehabilitation of people with disabilities. By the end of the 1970s Carey Hall had become St Andrew's Hall, and the YWCA College had moved to London. Overdale, the theological college of the Churches of Christ, joined the Federation in 1931; it closed when the United Reformed Church was formed in 1972.

It was apparent that much of the teaching of the colleges was best delivered jointly. So from 1922 the colleges were loosely coordinated through a federation, which from 1960 was headed by a president, and theology was taught by a central Department of Mission. Social Studies (which included Development Studies) and later English were added later. In the 1970s the numbers of Christian missionaries being sent overseas by UK-based missionary societies declined, and the 'missionary colleges' increasingly provided training and experience for church leaders and administrators from across the developing world, who could also sit for certificates or diplomas awarded by Westhill College or diplomas or degrees awarded by the Department of Mission, in association with the Theology Department at the University of Birmingham, whose first Professor of Theology, from 1940, was endowed by the Quaker Edward Cadbury. Its initial occupant was H. G. Wood, who had been Director of Studies at Woodbrooke College. In 1970 Quakers endowed a chair of mission studies shared between the colleges’ Department of Mission and the University Department of Theology, and they were also influential in creating a chair in pastoral theology (now more often called practical theology) at the university.

Paul Clifford, president from 1965 to 1978, was a Baptist minister who was strongly committed to the principles of ecumenism – that the future of Christianity, everywhere in the world, lay with the ecumenical movement, the coming together of the different Christian denominations. This was reflected in the appointment of Bishop Lesslie Newbigin as Professor of Ecumenics and Theology of Mission from 1974 to 1979. Newbigin had played a leading role as one of the founders of the Church of South India, where he had been Bishop of Madurai Ramnad from 1947 to 1959, after which he became the general secretary of the International Missionary Council and oversaw its integration with the World Council of Churches, of which he became associate general secretary, until he returned to South India where he served as Bishop of Madras from 1965-1974.

Clifford, with John Gordon Davies, who was professor of theology at Birmingham University from 1960-1986, also recruited Walter Hollenweger, a Swiss theologian and Pentecostal pastor, as professor of mission 1971-1989. His previous position was as secretary for evangelism in the World Council of Churches in Geneva. He pioneered the use of social media in evangelism. One of his ambitions, expressed in the creation of the Black and White Christian Partnership in 1978, was to bring the Pentecostal churches into the ecumenical movement. It recruited a remarkable set of leaders: Roswith Gerloff, who directed the Centre from 1978 to 1984 and explored the concept of “reverse mission” where previously poor or colonised nations send missionaries to previously rich ones; her co-director, the South African Mongani Mazibuko; their successor, Bishop Joe Aldred; his successor, the Roman Catholic White Father and Bishop, Patrick Kalilombe, from Malawi; the theologian Anthony G. Reddie and many others. Earlier, in 1975, the Centre for the Study of Islam and Christian-Muslim Relations was established – its work continues today at the University of Birmingham.

John Ferguson, president from 1979 to 1986, was a man of many parts: a Quaker, a pacifist, a classical scholar and specialist on comparative religion, professor of classics at the University of Ibadan in Nigeria, the first dean of arts in the UK Open University, a hymnwriter, playwright, and amateur musician and conductor. He was also a successful businessman: he and his wife Elnora created Carfax Publishing, which assembled a portfolio of academic journals which was sold to Routledge in 1997. When he died in 1989 he left £2.5m to establish a chair of global ethics at Selly Oak Colleges – eventually located in the University of Birmingham. The Centre for New Religious Movements was created in 1981, and the Centre for the Study of Judaism and Jewish-Christian Relations, headed by the Jewish scholar Norman Solomon in 1983.

There were valuable facilities on the site – sports fields, a swimming pool, and a hall for meetings and performance. In 1929 a guest house was opened for the use of missionaries on furlough. In the following year Edward Cadbury provided a new library building to house the growing number of books and the Mingana Collection of 3,000 manuscripts from the Middle East. An extension to the library in 1936 provided a home for the new Department of Mission, with professorships of missions and church history financed by Edward Cadbury, who also made provision for a chair in Islamics in 1947. A new library, the Orchard Learning Centre, was opened in 2001, shortly before the federation ceased to exist.

The individual colleges were much more than halls of residence: they were learning communities with their own tutors, where people experienced the interaction of different nationalities, faiths and opinions as well as the particular atmosphere of their own college. In the late 1980s, the Federation took on a programme for the training of Namibian refugees, who added another dimension both to the teaching of development studies and to the lives of the colleges where they lived.

There was always an international character to the colleges, with an awareness of foreign theologies that was unusual for British theological institutions until late in the twentieth century. In the 1930s the federation welcomed many important guests, not least Mahatma Gandhi who visited while in Britain for talks on the Indian constitution in 1931, Albert Schweitzer who came as a visiting lecturer, Charles Freer Andrews and Rabindranath Tagore. In the 1980s it pioneered dialogue between Christians and Muslims and between the black-led churches, e.g. of inner-city Birmingham, and the mainstream, and a broad theology of mission. It also developed strong links with the struggle against apartheid in South Africa Throughout its life it influenced both the theologies and the practices of churches overseas through its teaching and its open-minded approaches to issues of controversy. Most of those who taught, and many who came to study, were profoundly influenced by the experience, not just of formal lessons but also of the collegiality, the openness, the opportunities to debate and discuss with those from other backgrounds.

== Final Years of the Federation ==
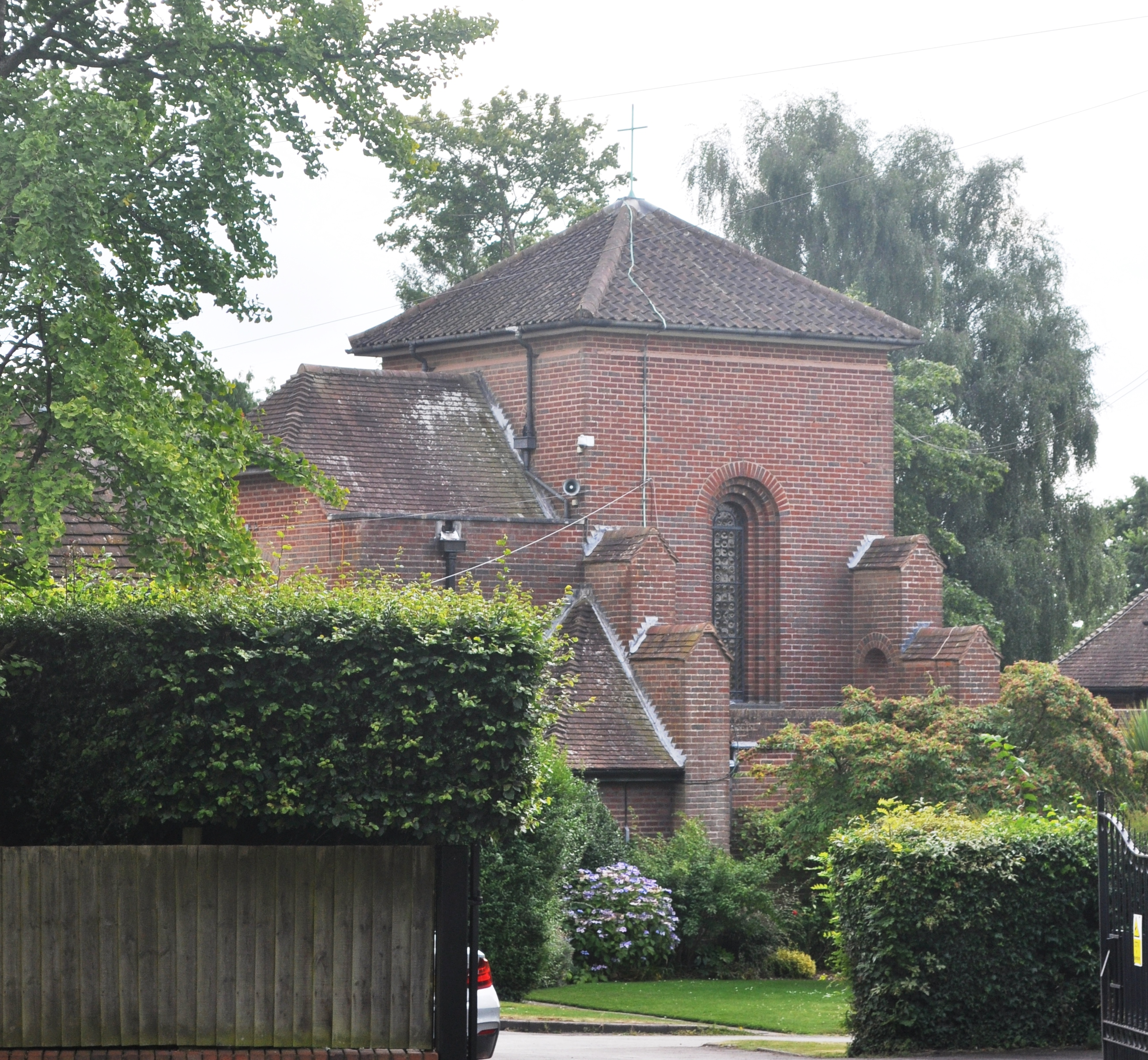
The College of the Ascension became the Al-Madhi Institute (college chapel pictured in August 2024).

Martin Conway, President from 1986, had spent most of his professional life in the World Council of Churches and other ecumenical organisations. All the colleges were under pressure. The missionary colleges were small and expensive to run and it was debatable whether training missionaries for work in developing countries overseas was better undertaken in countries where Christianity was expanding, rather than in the UK. Kingsmead College closed in 1993, its work and some of its staff joining what became the United College of the Ascension. The Multi-faith Centre also closed in 1993, the Jewish Christian Centre the following year.

Michael Taylor, a former director of Christian Aid took over as president in 1997. The Centre for Black and White Christian Partnership ended in 1999, and St Andrew's Hall closed in 2000 after the Baptist Missionary Society withdrew from the partnership with the United Reformed Church and the Council for World Mission; the buildings remain in use as the International Mission Centre, training missionaries for the BMS. The Church Missionary Society moved some of its training to Cowley, Oxford in 2005 and closed Crowther Hall. The United College of the Ascension closed in 2006 — some of its work, and that of the Department of Mission, is carried on by a reduced staff in the Selly Oak Centre for Mission Studies, located in The Queen's Foundation, Birmingham, an ecumenical theological foundation close to Birmingham University. The land on which Kingsmead College had stood was redeveloped as a free school, the University of Birmingham School, which took its first students in 2015. The College of the Ascension site was refurbished and expanded as the Al-Mahdi Institute – ironic in that this order of Shia Muslims would, in earlier years, have been the perfect partner for further explorations of the common ground between Christianity and Islam. Fircroft College and Woodbrooke College continue as independent colleges.

Westhill College — the largest by far in the federation — was small in comparison to other teacher-training colleges. To get over this, it worked jointly with Newman College, now Newman University, a Roman Catholic teachers training college on a separate campus about three miles away, but full joint-working was not acceptable to the Roman Catholic hierarchy and the collaboration ended. Westhill’s educational philosophy of child-centred education was out of favour with the government. Its Principal, Jack Priestley, and governors responded by trying to re-create the college as a liberal arts university and raising money to finance a modern new library, the Orchard Learning Centre — before suddenly agreeing to be taken over by the University of Birmingham in 2001, after which its training of teachers, social workers, and youth and community workers transferred to different parts of the University of Birmingham. By this time the Federation was clearly unsustainable, and in a separate agreement the University of Birmingham took over the central facilities and the staff there. Part of the site was developed for use by its Department of Drama and Theatre Arts.

== Legacy ==
The end of the Federation was far more than the loss of the individual colleges. It meant the loss of a culture, a way of working, of inclusiveness engendered by small institutions, of contacts overseas and within the churches in this country. It also meant the loss of a leadership role within liberal Christianity, and within the world of religious education. In words of some of those who worked there:

The Selly Oak Colleges, it is said, are better known in Bangladesh than Birmingham, and Lesotho than London. Yet they are one of the most exciting places in the world. Exciting because they are international: within the past five years they have seen students from 110 countries, a United Nations in miniature, and more peaceable! Exciting because they are ecumenical: virtually every main Christian denomination is represented: where else would you find four Protestant missionary colleges calling an American Roman Catholic to be their Dean, or an Anglican college with an Egyptian Coptic nun as tutor? Exciting because they are diverse: there is training for Christian mission, and centres for dialogue between Christians and those of other faiths; training of teachers and social workers, people studying for professional qualifications and people studying for fun, bishops and even archbishops studying with unemployed industrial workers. [John Ferguson and Jack Thompson, Foreword, Selly Oak Journal No. 1, 1984, p. 2]

It was Quaker initiative which founded the first four colleges. It was Quaker money which enabled the federation to come about and sustained it in its early years. It was Quaker hostility to legalism and binding documents which gave the Selly Oak Colleges freedom to develop and grow. (David Mole, The Selly Oak Tradition, Selly Oak Journal No.1, 1984, p. 3)

If mission and mission studies have a future, they must be rigorously ecumenical. Ecumenical does not only mean that we have to co-operate with all Christians. We must also listen to that which non-Christians have to offer... This is important for the tasks which lie ahead of us, namely, the search for a just world order, the overcoming of the threat of nuclear war and the solution of the ecological crisis. All this needs understanding on a global scale. And since war and greed start in the hearts and heads of people there is no world peace without peace between the religions, and between religious and agnostic people. (Walter Hollenweger, The Future of Mission and the Mission of the Future, Occasional Paper No.2, Selly Oak Colleges, 1989, p. 5)

On all these issues ... there are different points of view... Hence it is essential that staff and course participants be able and willing to communicate why they believe what they believe, and to do so credibly and intelligibly. There is no way, other than by encounter, open respect, sharing of personal and communal stories in the Lord, that mutual trust will grow and barriers will be overcome, for that is what mission is about. Differences, even theological ones, do not need to separate Christians or throw up obstacles among us. (Marcella Hoesl in Encounters in Mission: Two World Conferences, Occasional Paper No.2, Selly Oak Colleges, 1989, pp. 11–12)

Arguments about which economic policies will work best will be never ending, but any conclusion must not be allowed to escape three crucial tests. One is whether it upholds a number of moral values, not least those of equity and compassion. The second is whether the argument has taken account of other relevant disciplines. If we cannot make good Christian economic sense without taking the discipline of economics seriously, neither can we make good Christian economic sense without taking the discipline of Christian social theology seriously... We must be true to an inter-disciplinary approach in both directions ... The third test is whether the approach takes account of the experiences of the poor whose practical insights into the effects of economic policies are as important as the predictions of the theorists. (Michael Taylor, then Director of Christian Aid in Jesus and the International Financial Institutions, Occasional Paper No.17, Selly Oak Colleges, 1996, p. 5 ISBN 0-900653-22-1

== Notable alumni ==
- Nathaniel Aipa, Malawian Anglican bishop
- Ralph Barlow, Quaker, first Manager of the Bournville Village Trust, and Joan Barlow, Quaker and charity worker
- Roswith Gerloff, German pastor, academic, founding Director of the Black and White Christian Partnership
- Arvid Johanson, newspaper editor and politician
- Didymus Mutasa, Zimbabwean politician
- Alice Paul, American suffragist, feminist, and women's rights activist
- Israel Selvanayagam, Indian theologian and church leader
- Clare Winnicott, social worker, academic and psychoanalyst

== See also ==
- Society of Friends
- George Cadbury
- University of Birmingham
- Woodbrooke College
- Fircroft College
