= Alphonse Mingana =

20th-century Syriacist and scholar

- ܐܠܦܘܢܨ ܡܢܓܢܐ
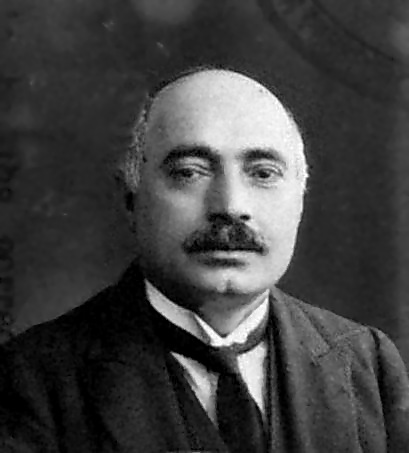
- Born: Hurmiz Mingana; 1878; Sharanesh, Ottoman Empire
- Died: 5 December 1937 (aged 59); Birmingham, England
- Occupations: theologian, historian, orientalist
- Known for: compiling the Mingana Collection

Alphonse Mingana (Syriac: ܐܠܦܘܢܨ ܡܢܓܢܐ), born Hurmiz Mingana (Syriac: ܗܪܡܙ ܡܢܓܢܐ; 1878 – 5 December 1937), was an Assyrian historian, Syriacist, and orientalist and who is best known for collecting and preserving the Mingana Collection, a collection of ancient Middle Eastern manuscripts at Birmingham.

== Life ==
=== Background and arrival in England ===
Mingana was born at Sharanesh, a village near Zakho (present-day Kurdistan, Iraq), to Paolus and Maryam Nano. He had seven siblings. Like the majority of Assyrians in the Zakho region, his family belonged to the Chaldean Catholic Church.

In 1913, Mingana came to England at the invitation of J. Rendel Harris, Director of Studies at Woodbrooke Quaker Study Centre, a Quaker Settlement at Selly Oak in Birmingham. Mingana remained at Woodbrooke for two years where he met his future wife, Emma Sophie Floor, a Norwegian student. The couple were married in 1915. In the same year Mingana was appointed to the staff of the John Rylands Library in Manchester to catalogue the Library's collection of Arabic manuscripts. He would live in Manchester until 1932, during which time his two children, John and Marie, would be born.

=== Compilation of the Mingana Collection ===
In 1924, Mingana made the first of three trips to the Middle East to collect ancient Syriac and Arabic manuscripts. The expedition was sponsored by John Rylands Library and Dr Edward Cadbury, the Quaker owner of the famous chocolate factory at Bournville, whom Mingana had met through Rendel Harris. A number of the manuscripts he returned with formed the basis of the Mingana Collection at Woodbrooke. Mingana added to the collection with manuscripts acquired on two further trips to the Middle East in 1925 and 1929, both trips were financed solely by Edward Cadbury.

In 1932 Mingana moved back to Birmingham to focus on cataloging the collection. By the time Mingana left John Rylands in 1932 he had risen to the post of Keeper of the Oriental Manuscripts. The first catalogue describing 606 Syriac manuscripts was published in 1933. A further volume published in 1936 describes 120 Christian Arabic manuscripts and 16 Syriac manuscripts. The third volume, cataloging 152 Christian Arabic manuscripts and 40 Syriac manuscripts, would be published in 1939, two years after Mingana's death.

Mingana died in Birmingham.

== Mingana Collection ==
The Mingana Collection contains 660 Syriac and Karshuni Christian manuscripts, 270 Arabic Christian manuscripts, and 2,000 Arabic Islamic manuscripts mainly on religious subjects. The manuscripts in the collection have proven to be a significant resource for Western scholarship in regards to the Qur'an and other religious scriptures.

The collection is housed at Special Collections at the University of Birmingham where it is available for study. The Museums, Libraries and Archives Council has designated this collection as being of international importance.

== Papers ==
Papers of Alphonse Mingana, including his correspondence, notebooks, reports and other items, are held at the Cadbury Research Library (reference number DA66).

== Woodbrooke Studies ==
Between 1926 and 1934, Mingana published a seven-volume series titled Woodbrooke Studies: Christian documents in Syriac, Arabic, and Garshūni. The volumes are:

- Vol. 1. Barṣalībi's Treatise against the Melchites; Genuine and Apocyphal Works of Ignatius of Antioch; A Jeremiah Apocryphon; A New Life of John the Baptist; Some Uncanonical Psalms. (book at the Internet Archive / alternative version at the Internet Archive)
- Vol. 2. The Apology of Timothy the Patriarch before the Caliph Mahdi; The Lament of the Virgin; The Martyrdom of Pilate. (book at the Internet Archive / alternative version at the Internet Archive)
- Vol. 3. Vision of Theophilus; Apocalypse of Peter. (book at the Internet Archive)
- Vol. 4. The work of Dionysius Barṣalībi Against the Armenians. (book at the Internet Archive)
- Vol. 5. Commentary of Theodore of Mopsuestia on the Nicene Creed. (book at the Internet Archive / Gorgias Press reprint at the Internet Archive)
- Vol. 6. Commentary of Theodore of Mopsuestia on the Lord's Prayer and on the Sacraments of Baptism and the Eucharist. (book at the Internet Archive / Gorgias Press reprint at the Internet Archive)
- Vol. 7. Early Christian Mystics. (book at the Internet Archive) [Vol. 7 sections are listed below.]
  - I. Medico-Mystical Work by Simon of Ṭaibūtheh
  - II. Treatise on Solitude and Prayer by Dādīshoʿ Ḳaṭrāya
  - III. Treatises on the Workings of the Grace, etc. by ʿAbdīshoʿ Ḥazzāya
  - IV. Treatise on the Shortest Path that brings us near to God by Joseph Ḥazzāya
  - V. Treatise on Eremitism by Abraham bar Dāshandād

In 1935, he began publishing a new series titled Woodbrooke Scientific Publications, with its first volume containing the Book of Treasures of Job of Edessa (a 9th-century Syriac encyclopedia).

== Selected publications ==
Catalogue

- 1934: Catalogue of the Arabic Manuscripts in the John Rylands Library, Manchester. 1192 p. Manchester: Manchester University Press.

Woodbrooke Studies

- Mingana, Alphonse (2012). Initial Woodbrooke Studies. Woodbrooke Studies. Vol. 1. Piscataway, NJ: Gorgias Press. doi:10.31826/9781463214265. ISBN 978-1-4632-1426-5.
- Mingana, Alphonse (2009). The Apology of Timothy the Patriarch before the Caliph Mahdi. Woodbrooke Studies. Vol. 2. Gorgias Press. doi:10.31826/9781463214210. ISBN 978-1-4632-1421-0.
- Mingana, Alphonse (2009). The Work of Dionysius Barsalībi Against the Armenians. Woodbrooke Studies. Vol. 4. Piscataway, NJ: Gorgias Press. doi:10.31826/9781463214241. ISBN 978-1-4632-1424-1.
- Mingana, Alphonse (2009). Commentary of Theodore of Mopsuestia on the Nicene Creed. Woodbrooke Studies. Vol. 5. Piscataway, NJ: Gorgias Press. doi:10.31826/9781463214234. ISBN 978-1-4632-1423-4.
- Mingana, Alphonse (2009). Commentary of Theodore of Mopsuestia on the Lord's Prayer and on the Sacraments of Baptism and the Eucharist. Woodbrooke Studies. Vol. 6. Piscataway, NJ: Gorgias Press. doi:10.31826/9781463214258. ISBN 978-1-4632-1425-8.
- Mingana, Alphonse (2012). Early Christian Mystics. Woodbrooke Studies. Vol. 7. Piscataway, NJ: Gorgias Press. doi:10.31826/9781463226411. ISBN 978-1-4632-2641-1.

== Sources ==
- Brock, Sebastian P. (1967). "Alphonse Mingana and the Letter of Philoxenus to Abu Afr" (PDF). Bulletin of the John Rylands Library. 50 (1): 199–206. doi:10.7227/BJRL.50.1.10.
- Coakley, J. F. (1993) A Catalogue of the Syriac Manuscripts in the John Rylands Library, Bulletin of the John Rylands University Library of Manchester, Vol. 75, No. 2, Summer 1993.
- Hunt, Lucy-Anne (1997) The Mingana and Related Collections Birmingham: Edward Cadbury Charitable Trust.
- Margoliouth, D. S. & Woledge, G. (1939) A. Mingana: a Biography and Bibliography. Birmingham: Selly Oak Colleges.
- Samir, Kahil Samir. "Alphonse Mingana 1878-1937" (PDF). Selly Oak Colleges, Birmingham, 1990. Archived from the original (PDF) on 12 August 2011.
