= Cadbury (disambiguation) =

Cadbury is a British-based confectionery manufacturer.

Cadbury may also refer to:

== People ==
- Cadbury (surname)
- Cadbury family, a prominent British family of industrialists descending from Richard Tapper Cadbury

== Places ==
- Cadbury, Devon, a village and civil parish in England
- North Cadbury, Somerset, a village and civil parish in England
- South Cadbury, Somerset, a village in the civil parish of South Cadbury and Sutton Montis in England

== Hillforts ==
=== England ===
- South Cadbury Castle, Somerset
- Cadbury-Congresbury, Somerset
- Cadbury Camp, Somerset
- Cadbury Castle, Devon

== Other uses ==
- Cadbury Athletic F.C., an English football club
- Cadbury Report, a British report on corporate governance
- GWR 4073 Class 7028 Cadbury Castle, a Great Western Railway locomotive
- Cadbury, fictional character from the Richie Rich comics series

== See also ==
- "Cadbury, The Beaver who Lacked", a short story by Philip K. Dick
- Cadbury Ireland, the company's Irish subsidiary
