= Mingana Collection =

Syriac manuscripts collection

- Established: 1924
- Collections: Syriac and Arabic manuscripts
- Collection size: >3,000 documents
- Founder: Alphonse Mingana
- Director: Susan Worrall
- Owner: University of Birmingham
- Website: www.birmingham.ac.uk/facilities/cadbury/birmingham-quran-mingana-collection/mingana-collection

The Mingana Collection of Middle Eastern manuscripts, comprising over 3,000 documents, is held by the University of Birmingham's Cadbury Research Library.

== History ==
In 1924 Alphonse Mingana, an ethnic Assyrian, made the first of three trips to the Middle East to collect ancient Syriac and Arabic manuscripts. The expedition was sponsored by John Rylands Library and Dr Edward Cadbury, the Quaker owner of the famous chocolate factory at Bournville, Birmingham, who Mingana had met through Rendel Harris. A number of the manuscripts he returned with formed the basis of the Mingana Collection at Woodbrooke College. Mingana added to the collection with manuscripts acquired on two further trips to the Middle East in 1925 and 1929, both financed solely by Edward Cadbury. In 1932 Mingana moved back to Birmingham to focus on cataloguing the collection. The first catalogue describing 606 Syriac manuscripts was published in 1933. A further volume published in 1936 describes 120 Christian Arabic manuscripts and 16 Syriac manuscripts. The third volume, cataloging 152 Christian Arabic manuscripts and 40 Syriac manuscripts was published in 1939, two years after Mingana's death.

The Mingana Collection is housed at the Special Collections at the University of Birmingham where it is available for study. The collection is designated by the Museums, Libraries and Archives Council as being of "international importance". A major exhibition of manuscripts from the collection entitled Illuminating Faith was held at the Birmingham Museum and Art Gallery in 2005.

== Collections ==
The Mingana Collection is made up of:

- 660 Syriac and Karshuni (Arabic in Syriac characters) Christian manuscripts including church documents, gospels, works on liturgy, lives of saints, and homilies. Among the earliest items are a number of important fragments originating from St. Catherine's Monastery, Sinai. About 50 of these manuscripts were scribed by Deacon Mattai bar Paulus of Mosul.
- 270 Arabic Christian manuscripts including a fragment of the oldest known text of the Acta Thomae, and a very early copy of the Arabic translation of some works by St. Ephrem.
- 2,000 Arabic Islamic manuscripts mainly on religious subjects. There are several copies of the Qur'an, besides two collections of fragments of Kufic Qur'ans, dating from the 8th and 9th centuries. Other works include Qur'an commentaries, Hadith, law, literature, science and mysticism.
- Examples of Armenian, Coptic, Georgian, Greek, Hebrew, Persian, Samaritan and Sanskrit manuscripts.

The manuscripts in the collection have proven to be a significant resource for Western scholarship in regards to the Qur'an and other religious scriptures. In 2015, a Quranic manuscript in the collection was identified as one of the oldest to have survived, having been written between 568 and 645.

The Virtual Manuscript Room (VMR) project presents full digitized manuscripts from collection. As well as high-resolution images of each page, the VMR provides descriptions from the printed catalogue and from Special Collections' own records.

== Sources ==
- Brock, Sebastian P. (1967). "Alphonse Mingana and the Letter of Philoxenus to Abu Afr" (PDF). Bulletin of the John Rylands Library. 50 (1): 199–206. doi:10.7227/BJRL.50.1.10.
- Brock, Sebastian P. (1969). "Notes on Some Texts in the Mingana Collection". Journal of Semitic Studies. 14 (2): 205–226. doi:10.1093/jss/14.2.205.
- *Samir, Kahil Samir. "Alphonse Mingana 1878-1937" (PDF). Selly Oak Colleges, Birmingham, 1990. Archived from the original (PDF) on 12 August 2011.
