= George Cadbury Jr =

British businessman (1878–1954)

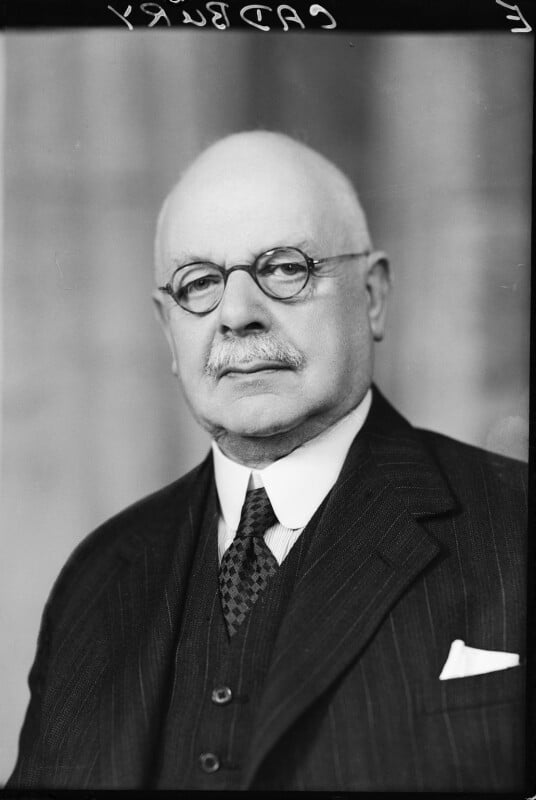
- Cadbury in 1949
- Born: 7 April 1878; Kings Norton, Worcestershire, England
- Died: 27 September 1954 (aged 76); Birmingham, Warwickshire, England
- Occupations: Chairman of Cadbury Brothers, business theorist, philanthropist
- Known for: Developing Cadbury Dairy Milk
- Parent(s): George Cadbury; Mary Tylor
- Relatives: Edward Cadbury (brother); Egbert Cadbury (half-brother); Marion Greeves (half-sister); Richard Cadbury (paternal uncle)

George Cadbury Jr (7 April 1878 – 27 September 1954) was a British chairman of Cadbury, business theorist, and philanthropist. He is best known for developing Cadbury Dairy Milk in 1905 which would become the company's best-selling product.

== Biography ==
George Cadbury Jr was the second son of George Cadbury and his first wife, Mary (née Tylor). He grew up in the house which is now occupied by the Woodbrooke Quaker Study Centre near Birmingham, England. He was educated, like his brothers, at the Quaker Leighton Park School.

A Director and later Chairman of Cadburys Ltd, he was interested in the scientific and chemical aspects of the business, including standardising recipes and recording them in a book. After ten years of developing milk chocolate with his R&D team, in 1905 he launched Cadbury Dairy Milk. The bar was a great sales success, and became the company's best-selling product by 1914.

== See also ==
Cadbury family
