= Royal Orthopaedic Hospital =

- The Royal Orthopaedic Hospital NHS Foundation Trust
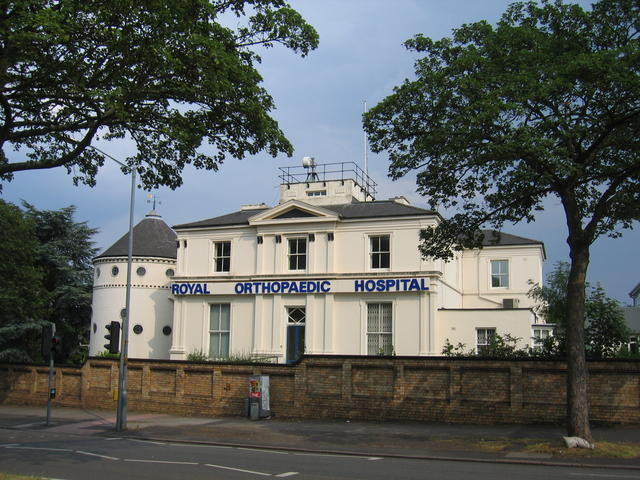
- From Bristol Road South, photo 2006

- Shown in West Midlands

Geography
- Location: Northfield, Birmingham, England
- Coordinates: 52.421°N 1.961°W

Organisation
- Care system: NHS
- Type: Specialist

Services
- Emergency department: No
- Speciality: Orthopaedic surgery

History
- Founded: 1909

Links
- Website: www.roh.nhs.uk

The Royal Orthopaedic Hospital (ROH) is a National Health Service specialist orthopaedic hospital situated in Northfield, Birmingham, England. The ROH specialises in bone and joint problems.

== History ==
The hospital's origins in a new convalescent home established by the Crippled Children's Union at The Woodlands in Northfield in order to treat children with deformities in 1909. The building, dating from 1840, had been donated to the Crippled Children's Union by George Cadbury, who then moved into Northfield Manor House later in 1909.

The Crippled Children's Union merged with the Royal Orthopaedic and Spinal Hospital to form the Royal Cripples' Hospital at The Woodlands in 1925. After the joining the National Health Service in 1948, the Royal Cripples' Hospital became the Royal Orthopaedic Hospital.

A new £8 million out-patient department was opened in May 2011. Its 24 consultation rooms, treatment rooms and other facilities replaced the temporary out-patients buildings that had been used since 1992.

== Notable staff ==
- Fanny Rebecca Smith (1884–1969), Matron for 23 years from 1925 until 1948. Smith trained at The London Hospital under Eva Luckes between 1908 and 1910, and remained as a staff nurse for two years. Before her appointment at Woodlands as matron, Smith was assistant Matron at the Royal Orthopaedic and Spinal Hospital from December 1913.

== Performance ==
The hospital was named by the Health Service Journal as one of the top hundred NHS trusts to work for in 2015. At that time it had 831 full-time equivalent staff and a sickness absence rate of 4.56%. 84% of staff recommend it as a place for treatment and 67% recommended it as a place to work.

It decided to stop providing paediatric surgery after the West Midlands Quality Review Service report concluded, "that paediatric inpatient surgery would be better delivered in a hospital setting with access to extensive centralised care facilities at all times".

== See also ==
- List of hospitals in England
- List of NHS trusts
- Healthcare in West Midlands
