= Roy Palmer (folklorist) =

- Born: Leicestershire, England
- Occupations: Folk singer, teacher, folklorist, author and historian

Roy Ernest Palmer (10 February 1932 – 26 February 2015) was a singer, teacher, folklorist, author and historian who wrote more than 30 books on folklore and folk song. In 2003 he was awarded the Gold Badge, the English Folk Dance and Song Society's highest honour.

He had much experience of performing to an audience, setting him apart from better known folk song scholars and anthologists who collected material but were less concerned with singing it.

== Life ==
Born in 1932, Roy Palmer was educated at the Grammar School, Coalville, and at Manchester University. While at college he met Harry Boardman, a folk singer whose left-wing views he shared throughout his life. He taught for many years in grammar and comprehensive schools around the Midlands and was headmaster of the Dame Elizabeth Cadbury School in Birmingham for eleven years.

In the 1960s he began recording and publishing traditional folk songs. A collection of his recordings are in the British Library and other materials are archived at the Library of Birmingham.

He met the BBC producer Charles Parker whilst organising informal folk song evenings for CND in Birmingham during the 1960s. The two men joined with other local enthusiasts to establish the Birmingham and Midland Folk Centre in order to sing folk songs, appraise each other's singing, collect and research songs and produce documentary dramas.

He took early retirement, making time to explore his deep passion in all aspects of folk culture - its lore, dialect, crafts, arts, plays and above all, its songs and music. From 1970 to 2007 he produced a steady stream of books, articles and reviews, exploring social history through the medium of folk song and street ballads.

In 2003 was awarded a gold badge, the highest honour bestowed by the English Folk Dance and Song Society, and in 2004 he received an honorary MA from the Open University.

He was a long-standing member of The Folklore Society, chairman of the 'Friends of the Dymock Poets' for seven years and on the editorial board of Folk Music Journal for 20 years.

== Bibliography ==
- Room for Company, Cambridge University Press, 1971: ISBN 0521081742
- Songs of the Midlands, EP Publishing, 1972: OCLC 48869635
- The Painful Plough, Cambridge University Press, 1972; ISBN 05210 85128
- The Valiant Sailor, Cambridge University Press, 1973: ISBN 9780521201018
- Love is Pleasing, Cambridge University Press, 1974: ISBN 0521 204453
- A Touch on the Times, Penguin, 1974; ISBN 01408 11826
- Poverty Knock, Cambridge University Press, 1974; ISBN 05212 04437
- Rigs of the Fair (Roy Palmer and Jon Raven), Cambridge University Press, 1976; ISBN 0521 209080
- The Rambling Soldier, Penguin Books, 1977: ISBN 9780140471038
- Folk Music in School (Robert Leach and Roy Palmer), Cambridge University Press, 1978; ISBN 0521215951
- Feasts and Seasons - Spring (Anthony Adams, Robert Leach, Roy Palmer), Blackie, 1978; ISBN 0216 903971
- Feasts and Seasons - Summer (Anthony Adams, Robert Leach, Roy Palmer), Blackie, 1978; ISBN 0216 90398X
- Feasts and Seasons - Autumn (Anthony Adams, Robert Leach, Roy Palmer), Blackie, 1977; ISBN 0216 902630
- Feasts and Seasons - Winter (Anthony Adams, Robert Leach, Roy Palmer), Blackie, 1977: ISBN 0216 903548
- Strike The Bell: Transport by Road, Canal, Rail and Sea in the Nineteenth Century Through Songs, Ballads and Contemporary Accounts, Cambridge University Press, 1978; ISBN 9780521219211
- Everyman's Book of English Country Songs, London: JM Dent and Sons, 1979: ISBN 0460 120484
- A Ballad History Of England: From 1588 to the Present Day, Batsford, 1979; ISBN 07134 09681
- Everyman's Book of British Ballads, London: JM Dent and Sons, 1980: ISBN 9780460044523
- Folk Songs collected by Ralph Vaughan Williams, London: JM Dent and Sons, 1983; ISBN 0460 04558X
- Folklore of Leicestershire and Rutland, Wymondham: Sycamore Press, 1985 ISBN 0-905837-22-3
  - --do.-- Stroud: Tempus Publishing, 2002: ISBN 07524 24688
- The Oxford Book of Sea Songs, Oxford University Press, 1986: ISBN 019 2141597
- The Sound Of History, Oxford University Press, 1988; ISBN 07126 73164
- Rose Shamrock Thistle Leek (Bryan Lester and Roy Palmer), Ricordi, 1989
- What A Lovely War - British Soldiers Songs, London: Michael Joseph, 1990; ISBN 07181 33579
- Britain's Living Folklore, David & Charles, 1991; ISBN 07153 93847
- Folklore of Hereford and Worcester, Logaston Press, 1992: ISBN 1873 827024
- Folklore of Gloucestershire, Westcountry Books, 1994; ISBN 18983 86072
- Ripest Apples, The Big Apple Association, 1996: ISBN 0952 910004
- Let us be Merry (Gwilym Davies and Roy Palmer), Green Branch, 1996: ISBN 0952 60311X
- Secret River (Roy and Pat Palmer), Green Branch Press, 1998; ISBN 0952 603128
- Folklore of (old) Monmouthshire, Logaston Press, 1998: ISBN 1873827 407
- A Taste of Ale, Green Branch, 2000: ISBN 0952 603160
- Boxing the Compass Sea Songs and Shanties, Heron Publishing, 2001: ISBN 0954 068203
- Folklore of Radnorshire, Logaston Press, 2001: ISBN 1873827172
- Herefordshire Folklore, Logaston Press, 2002: ISBN 1873 82758X
- The Folklore of Shropshire, Logaston Press, 2004; ISBN 19043 9616X
- Folklore of Shropshire, Logaston Press, 2004: ISBN 1904 39616X
- Folklore of Warwickshire, Stroud: Tempus, 2004 (first published Batsford 1976); ISBN 07524 33598
- Folklore of Worcestershire, Logaston Press, 2005; ISBN 1904 396402
- Folklore of the Black Country, Logaston Press, 2007; ISBN 9781 904396840
- Working Songs, Herron Publishing, 2010: ISBN 978 095 4068257
