= Marion Greeves =

British politician and Girl Guide executive

Marion Greeves MBE
- Greeves from a 1957 newspaper article
- Born: Marion Janet Cadbury; 18 July 1894; Selly Oak, Birmingham, England
- Died: 7 July 1979 (aged 84); Portadown, County Down, Ireland
- Known for: Member of the Senate of Northern Ireland
- Children: 5 including Rosemary Cadbury Dickson
- Parent(s): George Cadbury; Elizabeth Taylor
- Relatives: Egbert Cadbury (brother); Edward Cadbury (half-brother); Richard Cadbury (paternal uncle)

Marion Greeves, MBE (née Cadbury; 18 July 1894 – 4 July 1979) was a British politician who was the first of only two female members of the Senate of Northern Ireland. She was elected to serve as an independent member on 20 June 1950, retiring on 10 June 1969. Greeves was awarded an MBE in 1947, mostly for her work with the Women’s Voluntary Service (WVS). She was also Chief Commissioner of Girl Guides in Ulster. In 1957 she received the Silver Fish Award, Girl Guiding’s highest adult honour.

== Personal life ==
Born Marion “Molly” Janet Cadbury in England, Greeves was the daughter of George Cadbury, a Quaker philanthropist, and his second wife, Elizabeth Mary Taylor. She had three brothers and two sisters together with five step-siblings from George's first marriage. She was born at Woodbrooke, Selly Oak, Birmingham. She attended St James’ School, Malvern, from 1909 where she joined the Girl Guides. In 1912 she travelled to Dresden to study German and music.

Greeves married William “Bill” Edward Greeves (1890–1960), Deputy Lieutenant and High Sheriff of County Armagh, on 14 February 1918 at Bourneville Meeting House, They moved to Portadown in 1919. They had five children: Elizabeth, John, Rosemary, George and Thomas. They lived at Ardeevin House, Portadown, County Down. Greeves is buried at Friends Burial Ground, Moyallon, County Down.

== WWI ==
After leaving school, Molly trained in Birmingham as a Voluntary Aid Detachment (VAD) nurse at the Queen’s Hospital. The training comprised three intensive months, after which she was posted to St. Pierre Hospital, Dunkirk in Spring 1915. As the British authorities did not allow VADs in France, she travelled under the auspices of the Belgian Red Cross. In 1916 she worked in Abbeville, Rouen, Paris-Plages and then returned to Dunkirk.

In 1917 she met her future husband, William “Bill” Edward Greeves (1890–1960) of the Portadown Weaving Company. He was serving in Dunkirk with a Friends’ Ambulance Unit while she was treating “the first French casualties of the German gas attacks at Ypres”.

== After WWI ==
Molly returned to England in October 1916, where she attended Evandine, one of the Baird Schools for Domestic Economy, to prepare for housekeeping duties including learning about cooking and washing.

=== Portadown Infant Welfare Centre ===
Greeves and Winefred Haddon, the daughter of the doctor who delivered Greeves’ children, started the Portadown Infant Welfare Centre, to “reduce the high infant mortality rate due to ignorance and lack of hygiene.” The George Cadbury Trust provided the funds, local doctors gave their time for free, and patients paid what they could or in kind.

== WWII ==
Greeves was organiser for the Women’s Volunteer Service (WVS) for Armagh. By 1942 she was overseeing 1,600 volunteers involved in 43 projects, including providing first aid, firefighting, anti-gas and emergency cooking training for housewives. 26 dispersal centres distributed 4,000 garments. Six nurseries were established, close to 2,000 blood donors were enrolled and 71 savings groups were set up. WVS volunteers also manned canteens for H.M. Forces.

== Political career ==
Greeves was elected to Armagh County Council soon after she returned to Ireland from France. She joined the Ulster Women’s Unionist Association in 1925, taking on multiple roles over the years, including senior vice-president in 1975.

She was motivated to get involved in politics “after seeing the conditions in the institution in the city”. One of her first jobs was as secretary of Portadown Infant Welfare, a position she held for over 30 years. Her political work encompassed health, welfare and education. She established an infants' welfare centre, of which she became honorary secretary. She was chair of the Armagh County Welfare Committee from 1947 to 1969. She was also a member of the town planning committee and in 1965 spoke in support of establishing a university in Armagh.

In 1963 she was the first woman to be elected chair of the Northern Ireland Association of County and County Borough Welfare Committee, having previously been the vice-chair. In 1972 she was elected to the new Southern Health and Personal Social Services Board. She was also vice-chair of the Armagh County Health Committee.

In 1965 Greeves featured on a TV show, ‘Lady in Question’, talking about her “life in the front line of battle.” In 1966 she was reported as speaking out against the docking of horse tails, which had been outlawed in the 1952 Protection of Animals Act, but evidence of the practice had been seen at the annual Balmoral Show.

=== Senator ===
Greeves was the first woman to be elected to the Senate of Northern Ireland, as an independent member, on 20 June 1950, serving until 1969. In 1964 she was cited as “the lone figure standing for the rights of women against the 25 male senators”. Greeves was the only senator to serve between 1921 and 1969 who was not a member of the Orange Order. Upon her retirement it was said “it was in the field of the aged that her leadership had produced the greatest change in circumstances and opinions [in Northern Ireland]”. In 1966 she was elected to the Grand Jury for County Armagh, the only woman to have held the role up to that point.

== Girl Guides ==
Greeves joined the Girl Guide movement in 1910, the year it was formed. She became a Lieutenant while at St. James’ School. In 1912 she formed a Guide company in Northfield, Birmingham. When she moved to Belfast, Greeves continued Guiding. She was Chief Commissioner of Girl Guides in Ulster until 1962. In the mid-1950s she received the Silver Fish Award, Girl Guiding’s highest adult honour. Olave Baden-Powell, the Chief Guide, visited Ulster twice, staying with the Greeves family both times.

In 1963 the Marion Greeves Brownie Hut at Lorne Estate was named in her honour, Greeves having started the fundraising effort towards building the hut with a “very generous gift.” She was county president of Armagh Girl Guides until her death in 1979.

== Other activities ==
- Greeves was chair of the board of governors of Friends' School, Lisburn for 53 years, from 1922 to 1975. She served as the school’s chair from 1945 to 1952.
- In 1936 Greeves accompanied her mother to India to attend a National Council of Women of Great Britain conference in Calcutta. They also visited Quaker missions at Itarsi, Hoshangabad and Sohagpur.
- In 1962 Greeves and her husband donated land in Edenderry for the building of an old people’s home. Edenderry House opened on 5 October 1962 and remained open until the 1990s.
- In 1963 Greeves donated two trophies to the Portadown Music Festival: the William Greeves Memorial Perpetual Challenge Cup and the Marion Greeves Perpetual Challenge Cup. In 1968 she accepted the position of vice-president of the Portadown Music and Drama Festival Association, becoming president in 1975 until her death.
- She was a “mainstay” of the Portadown National Society for the Prevention of Cruelty to Children.
- She served on the committee for the Portadown Maternity and Welfare Centre
- She gave financial support to the Portadown St John Ambulance
- She was patron of Craigavon Cardiac Care Association until 1979

== See also ==
- Crosfield, John F. A History of the Cadbury family (1985) Pub. J Crosfield ISBN 0950734012
