= Northfield Manor House =

Building in Birmingham, England

- Interactive map of the Northfield Manor House area

General information
- Location: Birmingham, England
- Coordinates: 52.42827°N 1.959311°W
- Owner: University of Birmingham

Northfield Manor House is a Manor House, on Bristol Road South, Northfield, Birmingham, England. It was formerly known as Manor Farm, and under that name was home to George and Elizabeth Cadbury.

On 30 July 2014, the building suffered extensive damage caused by a severe fire, confirmed as arson. On 28 July 2021 almost seven years after the fire, it was reported that the building had been repaired after undergoing a two year reconstruction.

== History ==
The property had belonged to the University of Birmingham since 1953, when it was bought from the Cadbury family. A farm house, part of the Manor of Northfield, belonging to the Jervoise family, was recorded as being on the site circa 1750. In 1809 the estate was purchased by Daniel Ledsam, a London merchant. It is believed that he made alterations to the house and was responsible for the current main building.

George Cadbury bought the house in 1890 and the Cadburys moved there from Woodbrooke, in Selly Oak, Birmingham, in 1894. They lived there together until George's death at the house in 1922. During the Second World War Elizabeth invited the Friends' Ambulance Unit to use the grounds as a training centre. Elizabeth continued to reside there until her own death in 1951, aged 93.

On acquisition by the University, the property was renamed The Manor House and converted for use from 1958 as a hall of residence by H W Hobbiss. Additional wings have since been added. Its use as a hall of residence ceased in 2007.

Architecturally, it is in mock Tudor-style stone and brick, with timber-framing, projecting porch and carved bay windows probably by George Gadd who also designed some of the early Cadbury's factory buildings at Bournville. Internally the style is Jacobean with wood panelling, carving and inscriptions.

It is a grade A locally listed building and has been considered for national listing; however English Heritage declined to list it.

The Manor House Hall of Residence was used as a filming location for an episode of the TV crime drama 'Dalziel and Pascoe', appearing as 'Holm Coltram University' in Season 1 Episode 2, 'An Advancement of Learning', first broadcast 23 March 1996.

=== 2014 fire ===
On 30 July 2014, the building suffered extensive damage caused by a severe fire. There were plans to sell the building to Banner Homes for redevelopment if the planning application for conversion to apartments before the city council were successful. A West Midlands Fire Service spokesman said up to 100 firefighters had tackled the blaze. Twenty fire engines, including specialist hydraulic platforms and a high-volume water pump, were deployed. Firefighters said the cause was arson; the second such attack on the building in two days. Much of the main grade A listed building was damaged or destroyed. Three boys, aged 12, 14 and 15, were subsequently arrested and later bailed, on suspicion of starting the fire.

=== 2015 partial demolition and 2021 reconstruction completed ===
In June 2015 a large part of the Manor House was torn down by demolition crews working on behalf of the University of Birmingham, who still own the site, though it was claimed only those sections of the building that were structurally unsound had been demolished. A spokeswoman for the University stated it had "become clear" that much of the property had been "damaged beyond repair", due to the fire of 2014, and was in "a dangerous state", leaving them with "no choice but to take down substantial parts of the structure." Prominent local historian Carl Chinn was reported as urging the University to stop the demolition and to "consult with local people through community groups and their elected representatives over the future of this building", adding that the owners "should take a serious look at how they will restore the building, in partnership with the community." In response the University's vice-principal, Adam Tickell, claimed that despite the demolition of the majority of the structure it remained the intention of the University that the building should "be rebuilt to mirror the external appearance of the original manor house", going on to say the planning application had been revived and now included "provision for the rebuilding of the manor house". On 28 July 2021 it was reported that the building had been repaired after undergoing a complete two year reconstruction by HGP Architects.

== Northfield Manor Farm Park ==
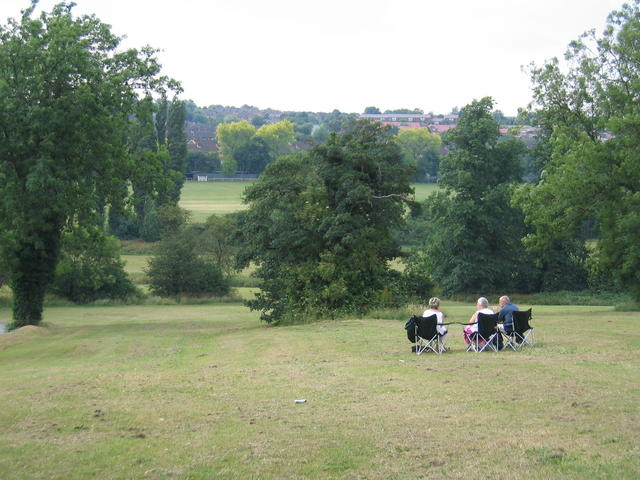
Manor Farm Park

Manor Farm Park was once the grounds of Northfield Manor House. It comprises a 50-acre open space with woodlands, meadows and a lake, created by damming Griffins Brook. Merritt's Brook also crosses the park.

There is a wooden picnic barn built for visiting schoolchildren in 1894.

The park opened to the public in 1951.
