= Elizabeth Cadbury =

British activist and philanthropist (1858–1951)

Dame Elizabeth Cadbury DBE
- Cadbury in the 1920s
- Born: Elizabeth Mary Taylor; 24 June 1858; Peckham Rye, Southwark, London, England
- Died: 4 December 1951 (aged 93); Northfield, Birmingham, England
- Education: North London Collegiate School
- Political party: Liberal Party (UK)
- Spouse: George Cadbury (m. 1888; died 1922)
- Children: 6, including: Egbert Cadbury; Marion Greeves
- Parent(s): John Taylor; Mary Jane Cash

Dame Elizabeth Mary Cadbury DBE (née Taylor; 24 June 1858 – 4 December 1951) was a British activist, politician and philanthropist. Her husband was George Cadbury, the chocolate manufacturer.

== Early life ==
Born in Peckham Rye, Southwark, Surrey, she was one of ten children of the Quaker company director and stockbroker John Taylor (d. 1894) and his wife, Mary Jane Cash (d. 1887). She grew up in an affluent family background. Her parents were active temperance crusaders, and enthusiasts for the adult education provided by mechanics' institutes. She was raised as a Quaker, visited workhouses with her mother and volunteered at children’s hospitals in her youth.

She and her sister Margaret were educated privately in Germany, and Elizabeth then attended North London Collegiate School from 1874 to 1876. In 1876 she passed the senior Cambridge University examination in ten subjects, but did not enter higher education. She did attend public lectures held at the London Institution.

On leaving school she carried out social work in the London docks and Paris, as well as teaching at the Sunday school of her Quaker meeting, taking a class of 40 boys in a poor district of south London. Following this in 1884, she started a boys’ club, as well as working with women in the slums of London. These activities were highly unusual for a lady of her age, marital status and social class.

== Family life ==
On a visit to her aunt and uncle in Birmingham, she met George Cadbury, co-founder of the Bournville chocolate factory. She and George were both Quakers who shared an interest in the temperance movement and adult education. They became friends and colleagues for over ten years due to these mutual interests.

George's first wife Mary Tylor died in 1887 and he became a widower with five children. In Peckham Rye, on 19 June 1888, Elizabeth married George and became his second wife. She moved to Birmingham. They had six children together: Laurence John, George Norman, Elsie Dorothea, Egbert, Marion Janet, and Ursula.

== Activism ==
Cadbury and her husband played a great role in the development of Bournville and she opened the 200th house there. In 1909, she opened the Woodland Hospital, which became the Royal Orthopaedic Hospital. She also built The Beeches, to provide holidays for slum children. She chaired the Birmingham school medical service committee and worked energetically to provide medical inspection in schools. Together with her husband, she participated in the reform of industrial working and living conditions through supporting the welfare, health and education of women and children in Bournville. Amongst the original Trustees of the Bournville Village Trust, in 1922 she succeeded George Cadbury as Chairman and supported the development of housing schemes and community life in Bournville village for over fifty years.

From 1941-48, she was president of the United Hospital in Birmingham. Throughout her life she campaigned for the education and welfare of women as a philanthropist and convinced, but non-militant, suffragist. She taught a class for the wives of her husband's students at the Severn Street Adult School in Birmingham.

The founder in 1898 of the Birmingham Union of Girls' Clubs, Cadbury was active in the National Council for Women from 1896 to her death. She was the founder of the Midlands Division of the Young Women's Christian Association. She was Vice President of the Electrical Association for Women, an organisation which sought to promote the benefits of electricity in the home and alleviate women's domestic drudgery. In 1911 she was appointed Chairman of Birmingham City Education Committee’s Hygiene Sub-Committee.

An active pacifist, Cadbury opposed the Second Boer War, fought between the British Empire and two independent Boer states, although Cadburys did donate chocolate free of charge in unbranded tins to soldiers. She was the first chair of the Peace and International Relations Committee of the National Council of Women, established in 1914. In 1916, she was elected to the National Peace Council, becoming its treasurer and then its vice-president. Along with Ishbel Hamilton-Gordon, Lady Aberdeen, Millicent Fawcett, and Mrs Corbett Ashby, she pressed for the inclusion of women's issues in the agenda of the Congress of Versailles. She was an energetic supporter of the League of Nations Union. In 1924 she led the work of a Public Utility Society, Residential Flats Ltd., which erected a residential club ‘designed to meet the needs of business and professional women who are enabled to have ‘a home of their own’, with the additional advantages of the communal services of a club’.

During and immediately following the First World War, Cadbury led local efforts to provide housing and schooling for young refugees from Serbia and Austria who came to Birmingham to escape conflict and poverty in their home countries. During the Second World War, she worked with Belgian refugees, and after that war continued her efforts with the International Council of Women.

In national politics Cadbury's sympathies were similar to those usually associated with Christian socialism, and she was a pillar of the Liberal Party. She was a Birmingham city councillor, for King's Norton ward, from 1919 to 1924, as a Liberal, losing her seat to a Conservative. Her political platform was a reformist one: municipal action in housing improvement, a school health service, and equality of opportunity. Among her political successes were her co-option to the Birmingham education committee in 1919, and her services as a magistrate from 1926. Cadbury also fought the King's Norton seat for the Liberals at the 1923 general election coming third but maintaining the Liberal share of the vote at 25%.

In 1936, aged 78, she led the UK delegation to the World Congress of the International Council of Women, held in Calcutta.

== Garden City Movement ==
Cadbury was influential in the development of Bournville Village and was vice-president of the Ruskin Society of Birmingham (RSB). The founder of the Hampstead Garden Suburb in 1904, Henrietta Barnett was inspired by a visit to Cadbury at Bournville Village.

== Manor Farm ==
The family home was Woodbrooke in Selly Oak, Birmingham, until 1903, when they moved to Manor Farm, now the Manor House, Bristol Road, Northfield, Birmingham. Woodbrooke then became the Woodbrooke Quaker Study Centre.

Elizabeth and George lived at the Manor together until George's death in 1922, and Elizabeth resided there until her own death in 1951, aged 93.

During World War II, she invited the Friends' Ambulance Unit to establish its training centre in the grounds. The grounds were also sometimes used for garden parties and other events in aid of worthy causes.

In 1948, at the family gathering to celebrate her 90th birthday, there were 150 relatives. At her death in 1951, Cadbury was survived by, among others, 37 grandchildren and 49 great-grandchildren.

== Honours ==
- For her public service Cadbury was made an OBE in 1918 and a DBE in 1934.
- The Belgian government honoured her in 1918 for her work with refugees, making her an Officer of the Order of the Crown, and she was decorated by Queen Elisabeth of the Belgians.
- The Red Cross organizations of Serbia, Greece, and Yugoslavia also made awards to her for her war work.
- The University of Birmingham made her an honorary MA in 1919 for her services to education and to the city.
- Dame Elizabeth Cadbury School in Birmingham is named in her honour.

The ten medals that Dame Cadbury was awarded throughout her life are now held at the Cadbury Research Library, University of Birmingham.

== Sources ==
- Delamont, Sara. "Dame Elizabeth Cadbury".

Non-profit organization positions
Preceded by Mary Clifford	President of the National Union of Women Workers; 1905–1907	Succeeded by Almyra Gray
