= Dame Elizabeth Cadbury School =

Location
- Woodbrooke Rd; Bournville; Birmingham, West Midlands, B30 1UL; England; 52°25′41″N 1°56′35″W

Information
- Type: Academy
- Motto: Strive for Excellence
- Established: 1955
- Local authority: Birmingham City Council
- Trust: Matrix Academy Trust
- Department for Education URN: 143438 Tables
- Ofsted: Reports
- Headteacher: Executive Headteacher - Mr J Till, Head of School - Mr C Seager
- Gender: Coeducational
- Age: 11+
- Enrolment: 775
- Houses: Durham, Exeter, Warwick and York
- Colours: Red, Blue, Yellow and Green (House Colours)
- Website: https://www.decschool.co.uk/

Dame Elizabeth Cadbury School is a coeducational secondary school and sixth form located in the Bournville area of Birmingham, West Midlands, England. The school was named after Dame Elizabeth Cadbury.

The school was established in 1955, and the author and folklorist Roy Palmer was headmaster of the school from 1972 to 1983. Later, the school gained specialist status as a Technology College and was renamed Dame Elizabeth Cadbury Technology College.

Previously a foundation school administered by Birmingham City Council, in October 2016 Dame Elizabeth Cadbury Technology College converted to academy status and was renamed Dame Elizabeth Cadbury School. The school is now sponsored by the Matrix Academy Trust.

The school is currently led by Mr James Till (Executive Headteacher) and day-to-day operations are overseen by Mr Christopher Seager (Head of School). The new logo was based on the other members of the matrix trust academy; like Bloxwich Academy, Barr Beacon School, Turves Green Boys' School and Smestow Academy.
