= Egbert Cadbury =

British pilot and businessman (1893–1967)

Major Sir Egbert Cadbury DSC, DFC, JP, DL
- Cadbury in 1943
- Born: 20 April 1893; Selly Oak, Birmingham, England
- Died: 12 January 1967 (aged 73); Weston-super-Mare, Somerset, England
- Education: Leighton Park School
- Alma mater: Trinity College, Cambridge
- Occupation: Businessman
- Years active: 1919–1963
- Organization: Cadbury
- Spouse: Mary Forbes Phillips (m. 1917–1967)
- Children: Peter Cadbury; Robin Cadbury
- Parents: George Cadbury (father); Elizabeth Cadbury (mother)
- Relatives: John Cadbury (grandfather)
- Family: Edward Cadbury (half-brother); Marion Greeves (half-sister)
- Military career
- Allegiance: United Kingdom
- Branch: Royal Navy; Royal Air Force
- Service years: 1914–1919
- Rank: Major
- Conflicts: World War I
- Awards: Distinguished Service Cross; Distinguished Flying Cross

Major (Honorary Air Commodore) Sir Egbert "Bertie" Cadbury DSC, DFC, JP, DL (20 April 1893 – 12 January 1967) was a British businessman, a member of the Cadbury family, who as a First World War pilot shot down two Zeppelins over the North Sea: L.21 on 28 November 1916, and L.70 on 6 August 1918: the latter while flying a De Havilland DH.4 with Robert Leckie as observer/gunner.

== Early life and background ==
Egbert Cadbury was born in Selly Oak, Birmingham, the youngest son of George Cadbury and his second wife Elizabeth Cadbury, and the grandson of John, the founder of the family confectionary business. A year after he was born the family moved to a new home, Northfield Manor House, in Northfield, Birmingham. He was educated at Leighton Park School in Reading, then went to Trinity College, Cambridge to study economics.

== First World War ==
The Cadburys were Quakers, and thus pacifists, but on the outbreak of the war, Cadbury left Cambridge and volunteered to join the Royal Navy, serving as a seaman aboard the HMY Zarifa, a yacht converted to an armed patrol vessel, manned mainly by Cambridge graduates, while his older brother Laurence joined the Friends' Ambulance Unit. Cadbury was eventually commissioned into the Royal Naval Air Service as a probationary flight sub-lieutenant, being confirmed in his rank on 31 May 1915. He was granted Royal Aero Club Aviators' Certificate No. 1343 on 19 June, after soloing a Grahame-White Biplane at the Grahame-White Flying School at Hendon. Cadbury was posted to the Naval Air Station at South Denes, Great Yarmouth, Norfolk, where one of his ground crew was Henry Allingham.

Cadbury first saw action on 9/10 August 1915, flying a Sopwith aircraft against four Zeppelins with no success. He later complained in a letter to his brother Laurence that the Sopwith gave him "cold feet". In September, Cadbury expressed his regret at "the murder of war", having lost several close friends in the squadron. In a letter of May 1916, he wrote that he was "sick of the war", expressing his distaste for the Government who "are not being able to use their brains". He also believed that an aircraft would never shoot down a Zeppelin "unless it catches it unawares".

On 30 June 1916, he was promoted to flight lieutenant.

On 27 November 1916, ten Zeppelins set out in two groups, heading for the Midlands and the North of England. One, the L.21, crossed the English coast at Atwick at 21:20, and then turned north to evade patrolling aircraft before heading to Leeds, where it was driven off by heavy anti-aircraft fire. An effective blackout shielded Barnsley from attack, so the airship headed southwest to the Potteries where it dropped a number of bombs on industrial targets in Stoke, causing some damage, but no casualties. At 01:30, it headed for home, setting a course towards Great Yarmouth. It was spotted by two RNAS aircraft north of Peterborough, but managed to evade them. Over East Dereham, it was spotted by Flight Lieutenant W. R. Gaynor, who was forced to abort his attack after suffering engine failure. However, reports of the L.21's movements had reached Great Yarmouth, so at dawn Cadbury and Flight Sub Lieutenant Gerard W. R. Fane took off in their B.E.2c fighters to intercept. They were joined by Flight Sub Lieutenant Edward L. Pulling from RNAS Bacton. Cadbury later reported:

I saw the Zeppelin approaching the coast and immediately chased after it. It was flying about 5,000 feet when I first saw it and it immediately climbed to 8,000 feet. I went after it. I approached from the stern about 3,000 feet below and fired four drums of explosive ammunition in to its stern, which immediately started to light. At the same time one of the other pilots was flying over the Zeppelin and to his horror he saw a man in the machine-gun pit run to the other side and leap overboard. Having seen the Zeppelin circle down to the sea in a blazing mass – a most horrible sight – I went back to Yarmouth. I could not say I felt very elated or pleased at this; somehow I was overawed at the spectacle of this Zeppelin and all the people aboard going down into the sea.

On 5 December 1916, the three men were decorated for their action, with Pulling being awarded the Distinguished Service Order, while Cadbury and Fane received the Distinguished Service Cross. Later that month, Cadbury became engaged to Mary Forbes Phillips, the daughter of the Reverend A. Forbes Phillips, the vicar of Gorleston. They were married by Reverend Phillips at Gorleston on 12 February 1917, and would go on to have two sons.

On 29 June 1917, Cadbury was promoted to flight commander. On 1 April 1918, the Royal Naval Air Service was merged with the Army's Royal Flying Corps to form the Royal Air Force, and the same day, Cadbury was appointed a squadron commander with the acting rank of major.

On the evening of 5 August 1918, Cadbury again engaged Zeppelins. Earlier that afternoon, the L.70 took off from Friedrichshafen with four other airships. They headed for the east coast of England, timing their flight to arrive off the coast just after dark. The commander of L.70 was Fregattenkapitän Peter Strasser, the Führer der Luftschiffe ("Leader of Airships", the commander of all Naval airships). However, the airship squadron was spotted out at sea by the Lenman Tail lightship, which signalled their course and position to the Admiralty. Cadbury was attending a charity concert at which his wife was performing when an RAF orderly found him. Cadbury drove back to the airfield, where he was informed that three Zeppelins had been reported about 50 miles (80 km) to the north-east, and knowing there was only one aircraft available, an Airco DH.4, he grabbed his flying kit and ran for it, beating a rival pilot to the cockpit by a split-second. With Captain Robert Leckie in the rear gunner's seat, Cadbury climbed up to over 16,000 feet (4,900 m) by jettisoning his reserve fuel and some small bombs, where he saw three Zeppelins ahead and above him. He later recounted:

At 22.20 we had climbed to 16,400 feet and I attacked the Zeppelin ahead slightly to the port so as to clear any obstruction that might be suspended from the airship. It was a most fascinating sight – awe inspiring – to see this enormous Zeppelin blotting the whole sky above one. The tracers ignited the escaping gas, the flames spreading rapidly and turning the airship into a fireball in less than a minute. The L.70 dived headlong into the clouds. It was one of the most terrifying sights I have ever seen to see this huge machine hurtling down with all those crew on board.

Cadbury and Leckie and another pilot, Lieutenant Ralph Edmund Keys, then attacked and damaged another Zeppelin, which promptly turned and headed for home. The Commodore of Lowestoft recommended Cadbury for a Victoria Cross for attacking two airships 30 to 40 miles (48 to 64 km) out to sea in a landplane in such bad weather. All three instead received the Distinguished Flying Cross. Cadbury wrote to his father the next day: "You will have heard probably before this reaches you that my lucky star has again been in the ascendant, and that another Zeppelin has gone to destruction, sent there by a perfectly peaceful live-and-let-live citizen, who has no lust for blood or fearful war spirit in his veins."

== Post-war career ==
After the war, Cadbury was transferred to the RAF's unemployed list on 15 April 1919. He returned to the family business, joining J. S. Fry & Sons, with which Cadbury's had merged in 1918, and soon becoming managing director. Along with Cecil Roderick Fry, he was instrumental in relocating Fry's manufacturing operations from Bristol to Somerdale Garden City. At its height, the Somerdale workforce numbered over 5,000.

Apart from his work for Fry's, Cadbury had many other interests. He served as a justice of the peace and was chairman of the Bristol Federation of Boys' Clubs for 20 years. On 29 August 1939, Cadbury was appointed honorary air commodore of No. 928 (County of Gloucester) Squadron, a Balloon Barrage Squadron of the Auxiliary Air Force. In 1944, he was appointed a Director of Lloyds Bank. On 12 December 1948, he became honorary air commodore of No. 3507 (County of Somerset) Fighter Control Unit, relinquishing his role in No. 928 Squadron after its disbandment on 22 November 1949. On 30 June 1950 he was appointed a Deputy Lieutenant of the County of Gloucester. He relinquished his appointment to No. 3507 FCU on 11 December 1953, but retained the rank of honorary air commodore. Cadbury was awarded a knighthood in the 1957 New Years Honours List for his "public services in Somerset and Gloucestershire", receiving his accolade from the Queen at Buckingham Palace on 12 February.

Sir Egbert retired as vice–chairman of Cadburys in 1962, and died of cancer at his home at Weston-super-Mare in 1967.

== Memorials ==
In October 2013, the shooting down of the L.70 was commemorated with a blue plaque fixed to Cadbury's lodgings in Kimberly Terrace, now part of the Carlton Hotel. In August 2014 a painting depicting the destruction of the L.70 was acquired by the Time and Tide Museum at Great Yarmouth.
