= William Adlington Cadbury =

English businessman (1867–1957)

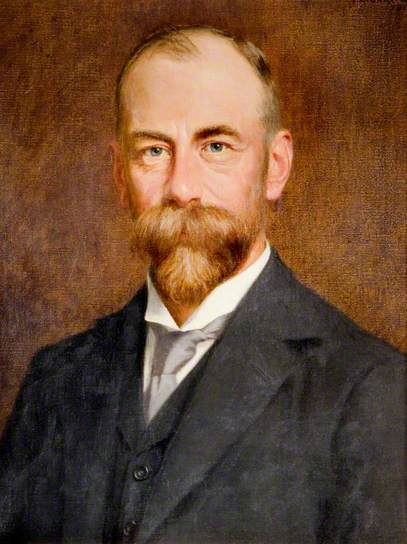
- Born: 17 February 1867
- Died: 8 July 1957 (aged 90)
- Occupation: Businessman

William Adlington Cadbury (17 February 1867 – 8 July 1957), was an English businessman affiliated with his family company, Cadbury, which his grandfather, John Cadbury had founded. He was Lord Mayor of Birmingham from 1919 to 1921.

He was born in Edgbaston and educated at Quaker schools. He began working at Cadbury in 1887. In 1905, he commissioned the first Cadbury logo. In 1921, the Cadbury script logo was introduced, based on William Cadbury's signature. Wealthy, but plain-living, he subsidized The West African Mail newspaper publication written by E. D. Morel. (see p. 213 of King Leopold’s Ghost by Adam Hochschild).

He met his future wife Emmeline Hannah Wilson in 1889 when she was six years old. She was the daughter of his stepmother's brother and her parents were Quaker Missionaries.

Three years later, after exchanging letters and gifts, he resolved to ask her father for her hand in marriage once she turned eighteen. She was nine years old. He was twenty five. They married in 1902 after she completed finishing school and between 1903-1915 they had six children. Together they pursued various charitable endeavours including creating the Trident Trust in 1911 and later the W.A. Cadbury Trust in 1923.

Emmeline became a magistrate in 1934. She was involved in several women's organisations including the Girl Guides Association, as President of the Birmingham Branch of the National Council of Women of Great Britain, Vice President of the Royal College of Nursing 1952-1966 and an Officer of the Order of St John of Jerusalem.
