= Fircroft College =

Specialist college in Birmingham, England

Coordinates: 52.4332°N 1.9451°W

Fircroft College is a specialist adult residential college based in Selly Oak, Birmingham, England.

The college was founded by George Cadbury Junior, son of George Cadbury Senior, in 1908 and offers over 150 short residential courses throughout the year, most of which last three days. Fircroft was founded with a strong ethos of social justice which continues to this day, with many learners coming to Fircroft with no or few prior qualifications. The short course programme covers subject areas such as English, Maths, ICT, Gardening, Personal and Social Development, Counselling and Mentoring. These courses are aimed at helping adults improve their skills and confidence and work towards reaching their own personal or work goals. The college also runs a number of professional short courses and qualifications aimed at adults working or involved in the voluntary and community sectors. As well as the short course programme, there is a 30-week Access to Higher Education programme for adults wishing to progress to university - this course has non-residential as well as residential places available.

Fircroft College is located in George Cadbury Junior's family home, originally called Primrose Hill, set in six acres (24,000 m^{2}) of gardens and woodland. An adjoining teaching centre housing a new library, conference rooms, IT facilities and teaching rooms was opened in 2005. The college uses these facilities to host a number of conferences, training events, meetings, away days and team building sessions during the course of the year.

It was federated with eight other nearby colleges, known collectively as Selly Oak Colleges.

== Notable alumni ==
- Oliver O'Connor Barrett, artist
- Dunduzu Chisiza, political activist
- Doris Fisher, Baroness Fisher of Rednal, politician
- Edward Fletcher, politician
- Arvid Johanson, newspaper editor and politician
- Didymus Mutasa, Zimbabwean politician
