= Richard Tapper Cadbury =

English draper, abolitionist and philanthropist

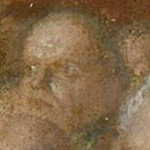
- Cadbury in 1840.
- Born: 1768; Likely Exeter, England
- Died: 13 March 1860 (aged 91–92); Birmingham, Warwickshire, England
- Occupation: Draper
- Spouse: Elizabeth Head
- Children: 10, including John

Richard Tapper Cadbury (1768 – 13 March 1860) was an English draper, abolitionist and philanthropist. He came to Birmingham in 1794 and started a linen draper's business in partnership with a fellow Quaker. His children included John Cadbury, who was given help to start a tea and coffee business that would develop into Cadbury's. Successive later members of the family became important in the manufacturing and charity sectors, chiefly from their wealth and innovations in chocolate.

== Early life ==
Cadbury came from Exeter and was born around 1768. His father was a maker of serge and he was apprenticed to a draper in Gloucester, after which he worked for others in the town.

He entered into partnership with Joseph Rutte in Birmingham from 1794. In 1824, Cadbury senior financed John Cadbury to start a tea and coffee business next door, which later became Barrow's Stores; Benjamin ran the main business from 1829. Richard was given a wage and was able to take on good works.

Cadbury continued to develop the business, but also took a role in civil affairs. He served on Birmingham General Hospital's Board and that of the Eye Hospital as well as getting involved in the affairs of the Town Council.

Cadbury was an abolitionist and in 1840 attended the World's Anti-Slavery Convention at Freemasons' Hall, London. Delegates came from several countries and a commemorative painting, now displayed in the National Portrait Gallery, records all the notable people who were present. Tapper Cadbury is right at the back of the crowd and his portrait is one of the smallest.

== Death ==
Cadbury died in 1860, the same year that John Cadbury broke his financial links with his brother, and shortly after left the business to be run in turn by his sons.

== Personal life ==
Cadbury married Elizabeth Head from Ipswich in 1796. Two years later the partnership with Rutte was dissolved. They had ten children: John, James, Ann, Maria, Lucretia, Sarah, Emma Joel, Elizabeth Head, Richard, Benjamin Head, and Joel. In addition, Elizabeth ran the business in his absence. They had a sizable house in the city centre.
