= Peter Cadbury =

English businessman

- Born: Peter Egbert Cadbury; 6 February 1918; Great Yarmouth, Norfolk, England
- Died: 17 April 2006 (aged 88)
- Education: Leighton Park School; Trinity College; Cambridge
- Spouse(s): Benedicta Bruce (1947–1968); Jennifer Morgan-Jones (1970–1976); Jane Mead (1976–?)
- Children: 5, including Joel Cadbury
- Parent(s): Sir Egbert Cadbury; Mary Forbes

Peter Egbert Cadbury (6 February 1918 – 17 April 2006) was a British entrepreneur.

== Early life and education ==
Cadbury was born at Great Yarmouth in Norfolk, the son of Sir Egbert Cadbury and his wife, Mary Forbes, the daughter of Rev. Forbes Phillips of Gorleston in Suffolk. His father was a World War I flying ace and managing director of Cadbury Brothers, the chocolate enterprise. Cadbury was educated at Leighton Park School, a Quaker school in Reading, Berkshire founded by his grandfather, George Cadbury, and at Trinity College, Cambridge.

== Career ==
Cadbury never worked in the family business. He followed his father into flying, with an early career as a test pilot for jet fighters during World War II.

In 1993, he recounted his first flight ever in a jet, the pioneering Gloster Meteor, in late 1943. There were no two-seat versions of the Meteor, which was still under development, so his first solo in a Meteor would also be his first flight in one:

"When [check pilot] Michael Daunt was satisfied that I knew enough about the Meteor to be trusted to fly it, I was put in the cockpit . . .'Line up, set the rpm at 14,000, watch the jet pipe temperature and good luck,' he said, slapped the side of the aeroplane and walked away. I did as I was told and released the brakes . . . It was a thrill I shall never forget, as the aircraft accelerated down the runway . . . My immediate reaction was the lack of noise or vibration . . . The Meteor project was Top Secret and we were told not to fly out of the Moreton Valence area and avoid having to force-land anywhere else."

He stood as a Liberal candidate in Stroud at the 1945 General Election and finished third. He qualified as a barrister, playing a minor role in the Nuremberg War Crimes trials, before deciding his future did not lie in law. Borrowing £75,000 from his father, Cadbury purchased the Keith Prowse theatre booking agency.

After this, he was involved as a company director in the establishment of Tyne Tees Television and led the consortium responsible for Westward Television, the first ITV franchise holder for the southwest of England, becoming its executive director. He also owned his own airline and travel business.

== Personal life ==
Cadbury was known for his frequent rows with neighbours, the press, fellow club members and liverymen (he was a Currier), as well as even with his own board of directors. He was more than once involved in fistfights on roads over his driving. He owned an Aston Martin V8 Vantage, a Ferrari, a Bentley, numerous yachts, racehorses, properties in the West Indies, and a succession of grand country mansions, one of which had an airstrip and a hangar for five aircraft. As a result of his ongoing conflict with the IBA — the then-regulator of ITV — Westward lost the round of franchise renewals in 1980, and were replaced by TSW.

Cadbury's once owned Tittenhurst Park at Sunninghill in Berkshire, which he later sold to Ron Blindell which was subsequently purchased by John Lennon following Blindell's death. He was an animal lover who kept a parrot, a Great Dane, and a Rwandan gorilla.

He was married three times. The first time was to Benedicta Bruce in 1947 (with Spitfire pilot Douglas Bader as best man), with whom he had a son and a daughter; the marriage ended in divorce in 1968. He married again in 1970 to Jennifer Morgan-Jones, who was 27 years younger and with whom he had another son (Joel Cadbury, one-time owner of the Groucho Club), before they divorced in 1976. In that same year, he married a third time, to Jane Mead and had two more sons.

Along with nine other individuals Cadbury contributed £1,000 in 1963 to the film production of Harold Pinter's "The Caretaker".

Cadbury died on 17 April 2006, at the age of 88.
