= Richard Cadbury =

English entrepreneur, chocolate-maker and philanthropist (1835–1899)

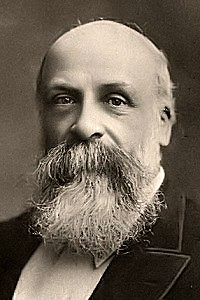
- Richard Barrow Cadbury
- Born: Richard Barrow Cadbury; 29 August 1835; Edgbaston, Warwickshire, England
- Died: 22 March 1899 (aged 63); Jerusalem, Mutasarrifate of Jerusalem, Ottoman Empire
- Occupations: Chocolate manufacturer, entrepreneur, philanthropist
- Years active: 1861–1899
- Known for: Co-founder of Bournville with his brother George Cadbury
- Spouses: Elizabeth Adlington (m. 1861, d. 1868); Emma Jane Wilson (m. 1871)
- Children: 8, including: Barrow Cadbury; William Adlington Cadbury; Beatrice Boeke-Cadbury
- Relatives: Cadbury family

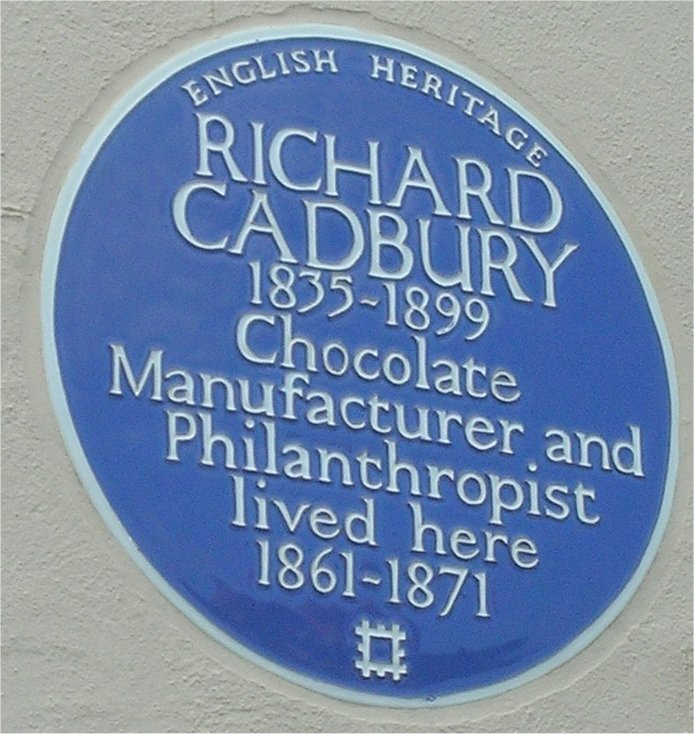
English Heritage blue plaque at Wheeley's Road, Edgbaston

Richard Barrow Cadbury (29 August 1835 – 22 March 1899) was an English entrepreneur, chocolate-maker and philanthropist. He was the second son of the Quaker John Cadbury, founder of Cadbury's cocoa and chocolate company.

== Career ==
Together with his younger brother George he took over the family business in 1861. Richard was the first to commercialise the connection between romance and confectionery with the company producing a heart-shaped box of chocolates for Valentine's Day in 1868. In 1878 they acquired 14 acres (57,000 m^{2}) of land in open country, four miles (6 km) south of Birmingham where they opened a new factory in 1879. Over the following years, more land was acquired and a model village was built for his workers, which became known as Bournville.

He donated Moseley Hall to the City of Birmingham, for use as a children's convalescent home.

== Personal life and death ==
Cadbury married Elizabeth Adlington in 1861. They had four children. After her death in 1868, he remarried in 1871 to Emma Jane Wilson, a widow with seven children. They had four daughters together: Edith, Helen, Margaret and Beatrice.

During a trip to the Khedivate of Egypt, Cadbury fell ill with diphtheria. He was taken for treatment to the hospital of the Church's Ministry Among Jewish People in the Mutasarrifate of Jerusalem, but died on 22 March 1899, aged 63.

== Aftermath ==
At the time of Cadbury's death, he and his brother George owned 100% of the ordinary shares in their business. The business was restructured and his sons Barrow and William became managing directors together with George's sons, Edward and George Jr.

In 1905 the executors of Cadbury's estate distributed £40,000 to various charities including £10,000 to the Temperance Hospital in London.

His wife Emma died in 1907 after falling down some stairs while at sea on the Empress of India. His daughter Beatrice Boeke-Cadbury worked as an educational reformer and, for her work saving Jewish children during the Holocaust, was posthumously honoured as one of the Righteous Among the Nations.
