= Beatrice Boeke-Cadbury =

Dutch-English social activist, educator, and missionary (1884–1976)

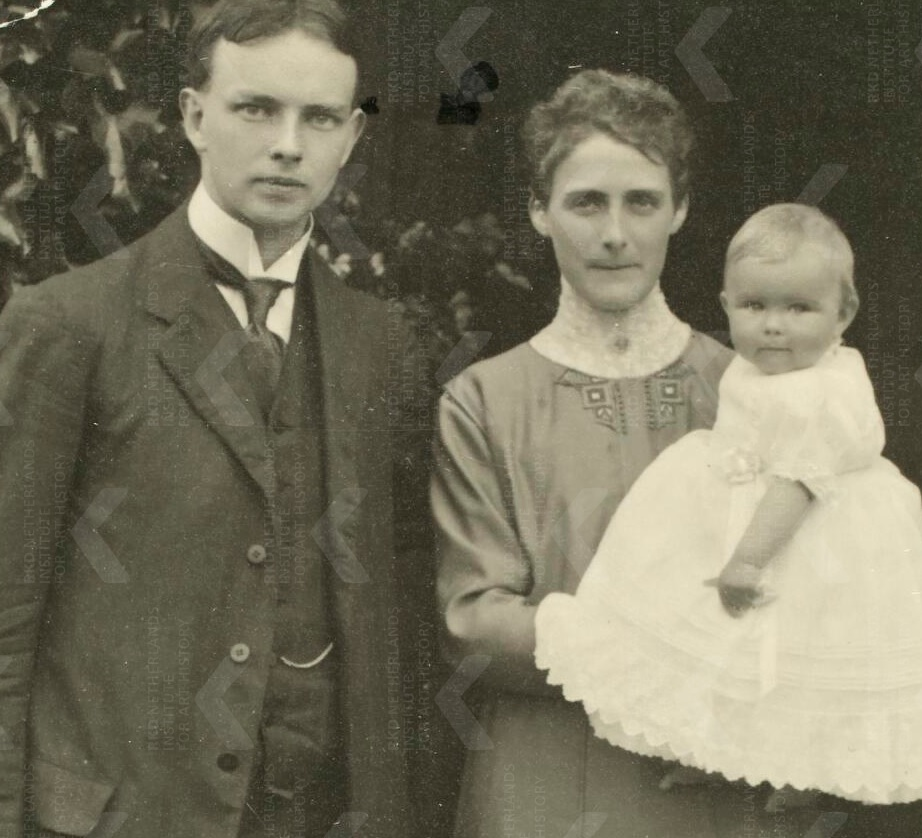
- Kees Boeke and Beatrice Boeke-Cadbury, June 1913
- Born: Beatrice Cadbury; 28 April 1884; London, England
- Died: 13 February 1976 (aged 91); England
- Other names: Betty Boeke, Beatrice Boeke
- Spouse: Kees Boeke

Beatrice Boeke-Cadbury (also Betty Boeke, Beatrice Boeke, Beatrice Cadbury; 28 April 1884 – 13 February 1976) was an English-Dutch social activist, educator, and Quaker missionary. For her work educating and hiding Jewish children during the Holocaust, she was posthumously recognized as one of the Righteous Among the Nations.

== Life ==
=== Early life ===
Born to Richard Cadbury and Emma Richard Cadbury (née Wilson), and an heiress to the Cadbury chocolate fortune, Cadbury was raised in an ascetic Quaker household. She was educated at Westfield College in London.

She was involved in the Friends' Foreign Mission Association (FFMA), which is how she met her future husband, Cornelius "Kees" Boeke. They married on 19 December 1911.^{:3} Between 1912 and 1914 they served as Quaker missionaries in Syria.^{:3,}

==== Pacifism ====
With the outbreak of World War I, the couple returned to England; Boeke taught briefly before being fired for his pacifist views and public protests against conscription and war, for which he was imprisoned and later, in 1918, deported to the Netherlands. During the 1920s, the young couple protested against elections with anarchists and other left-wing radicals.^{:39}

The couple had eight children between 1912 and 1927. They resigned from the Religious Society of Friends during the 1920s, though Beatrice returned to the faith late in her life.

==== Cadbury fortune ====
Throughout the couple's lives, Boeke-Cadbury's inheritance financed their educational organizations and other endeavors, though this was indirect.^{:3} In 1921, the couple relinquished their shares and bonds because of their anti-capitalist views, but friends, in consultation with the workers' council at the Cadbury factory, who supported the couples' activism, set up a trust to fund their family and work. In 1922, Boeke-Cadbury transferred many of her shares to Cadbury workers. Boeke himself refused to pay taxes because of governmental military spending, which led to economic uncertainty throughout their lives. The couple also did not recognize property ownership, which led to several evictions.

=== Education reform ===
==== Werkplaats ====
Due to their refusal to pay money to the state, their children could not attend state-sponsored education, including the Montessori school in which they were enrolled, so the Boekes founded their own school in 1926. This school was the Werkplaats Kindergemeenschap (Workshop Children's Community) in Bilthoven.^{:45,} Boeke-Cadbury also taught English at the school.^{:4}

==== Resistance ====
In 1938, the school began offering classes for German-Jewish refugee children fleeing from Nazi Germany. After the Nazis ordered the segregation of schools in the Netherlands in 1941, Boeke-Cadbury wanted to close the school, but her husband convinced her that they would be able to make more of a difference if it remained open. Boeke-Cadbury taught at a private Jewish school in Loosdrecht.

In the fall of 1942, Boeke-Cadbury and her husband began hiding nine-year-old Norman Magnus and his six-year-old sister Anita; the children had false papers with false identities; they, and later, two of their sisters, remained with the Boeke family until 1944, when they rejoined their parents in hiding in Limburg. During the time the children were staying with them, Boeke and other members of the school were arrested and questioned; two of their employees were murdered by the regime, but no one gave away the children.

==== Postwar life ====
Dutch princesses Beatrix, Irene and Margriet attended the Werkplaats after the war.^{:5,}

In the 1950s, the couple moved to Lebanon to set up an international organization for the education of Arab refugees, but they quickly returned to the Netherlands when Boeke-Cadbury fell ill.^{:5,}

=== Honours ===
In June 1991, a portrait bust of Boeke-Cadbury by Fokke de Hoog was created for a reunion of the Werkplaats.

On 4 July 1991, Yad Vashem recognized Boeke-Cadbury and her husband as Righteous Among the Nations. They are commemorated on the Wall of Honor.

== See also ==
- List of peace activists

== Works ==
- Kees Boeke and Beatrice Boeke-Cadbury, Staat of gemeenschapsleiding: een persoonlijke brief aan onze vrienden, om te verklaren hoe wij er toe zijn gekomen, ons te onttrekken aan den staat [State or community leadership: a personal letter to our friends, explaining how we came to withdraw from the state] (1922). OCLC 65298955
- Beatrice Boeke-Cadbury, Het leven van Kees Boeke [The Life of Kees Boeke] (Purmerend: Muuses, 1971). OCLC 63490279
  - Republished with the same title: Het leven van Kees Boeke (Bilthoven: De Bron, 2003). OCLC 822860488
