= Edward Cadbury =

British businessman

- Born: 1873
- Died: 21 November 1948 (aged 74–75)
- Occupations: Chairman of Cadbury Brothers, business theorist, philanthropist
- Known for: Pioneering works on management and organisations
- Parent(s): George Cadbury; Mary Tylor
- Relatives: George Cadbury Jr (brother); Egbert Cadbury (half-brother); Marion Greeves (half-sister); Richard Cadbury (paternal uncle)

Edward Cadbury (1873 – 21 November 1948) was a British chairman of Cadbury Brothers, business theorist, and philanthropist, known for his pioneering works on management and organisations.

== Biography ==
Edward Cadbury was the eldest son of George Cadbury and his first wife, Mary (née Tylor). He grew up in the house which is now occupied by the Woodbrooke Quaker Study Centre near Birmingham, England, and around 1890 studied in London and Germany.

After being educated at Leighton Park School, Cadbury joined the family business of Cadbury Brothers in 1893, becoming a managing director in 1899 and chairman in 1937, retiring in 1943. He was chairman of the Daily News Ltd from 1911 to 1930. Cadbury was also one of the founders of Selly Oak Colleges, which merged into the University of Birmingham, and was the first Chairman and Treasurer of Council of Selly Oak Colleges.

Cadbury's research interests were in "economics, management and organisations... including workers' welfare and women's employment rights."

In response to Taylor's time studies and his concept of scientific management, Cadbury criticized Taylor for transferring employee skills and initiatives from the individual worker to management. This argument was published in Cadbury's essay "Some Principles of Industrial Organisation: The Case for and against Scientific Management" in 1914.

== Selected publications ==
Books:

- Cadbury, Edward, Marie Cecile Matheson, and George Shann. Women's work and wages: A phase of life in an industrial city. University of Chicago Press, 1907.
- Cadbury, Edward, and George Shann. Sweating, 1907.
- Cadbury, Edward. Experiments in Industrial Organization. (1912).

Articles, a selection:

- Cadbury, Edward. "Some principles of Industrial Organisation: The Case for and against Scientific Management" The Sociological Review 7.2 (1914): 99-117.
- Cadbury, E. "Reply to CB Thompson." Sociological Review 7 (1914): 266–9.
