= John Cadbury =

English Quaker and businessperson (1801–1889)

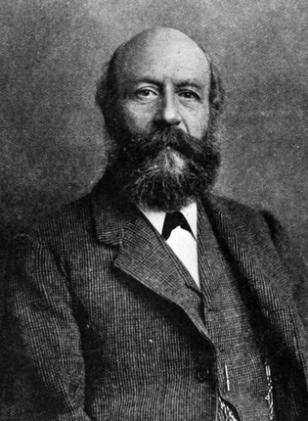
- Born: 12 August 1801; Birmingham, Warwickshire, England
- Died: 11 May 1889 (aged 87); Birmingham, Warwickshire, England
- Resting place: Witton Cemetery, Birmingham
- Education: Joseph Crosfield's Quaker School
- Occupation: Businessperson
- Years active: 1818–1861
- Known for: Founding Cadbury
- Spouses: Priscilla Ann Dymond (m. 1826; died 1828) Candia Barrow (m. 1831; died 1855)
- Children: 7, including George and Richard
- Father: Richard Tapper Cadbury
- Family: Cadbury family

John Cadbury (12 August 1801 – 11 May 1889) was an English Quaker and businessman, who founded the Cadbury chocolate company in Birmingham, England. He was also involved in activism and philanthropy, championing workers' rights, environmental and industrial reform, temperance, animal welfare, education, and healthcare, while actively opposing cruelty, exploitation, and indulgent practices.

== Biography ==
=== Early life and education ===
John Cadbury was born on 12 August 1801 in Birmingham to Richard Tapper Cadbury, a linen draper, and his wife Elizabeth Head Cadbury. He was from a wealthy Quaker family that moved to the area from the west of England. Cadbury attended Joseph Crosfield's Quaker School at Hartshill, Warwickshire.

=== Quakerism ===
Cadbury was deeply involved in the Birmingham Friends Meeting, where he served as an elder for many years. At the age of 29, he was appointed clerk of the Warwickshire North Friends Monthly Meeting, and a year later, he took on the role of Overseer. He was the inaugural president of the Friends' Reading Society and actively supported the Seven Street Friday-day Schools. Cadbury also made multiple missionary trips to Ireland on behalf of the Quakers.

=== Founding Cadbury ===
As was customary for Quakers in the early 19th century, Cadbury did not enter a university or pursue a military career, turning his energies toward business instead. He was first apprenticed to a tea dealer in Leeds in 1818. In 1824, Cadbury opened a shop at 93 Bull Street, Birmingham, selling cocoa and drinking chocolate that he prepared himself, along with tea, coffee, hops, and mustard. He eventually decided to start commercial manufacture, opening a warehouse in Crooked Lane in 1831. In 1842, he was selling sixteen varieties of drinking chocolate and eleven varieties of cocoa.

In 1846, Cadbury entered into a partnership with his brother Benjamin, establishing Cadbury Brothers. The company moved to a new factory in Bridge Street in 1847. In 1850, the Cadbury brothers pulled out of the retail business, which was passed to John's son, Richard Cadbury (Barrow's remained a leading Birmingham store until the 1960s). The partnership was dissolved by mutual consent in 1856 and John retired in 1861, following the death of his wife. Control of the manufacturing business passed to his sons Richard and George.

=== Activism and philanthropy ===
Between 1830 and 1841, Cadbury served as a Poor Law guardian, where he vocally opposed the exploitation of climbing boys and criticised the indulgent feasting practices of local poor law officials. A passionate advocate for environmental reform, he set an example by reducing pollution in his own factory and played a significant role in securing legislation to address industrial pollution.

Cadbury opposed animal cruelty including bull-baiting and was a supporter of the Animals' Friend Society. He was also a supporter of the Peace Society and an advocate for Sunday schools.

Cadbury was an abstainer and active in the temperance movement. He saw drinking chocolate as an alternative for alcoholic beverages. At the time of his death, he had been a total abstainer for half a century and was one of the first to sign the pledge for the formation of a temperance society in Birmingham. He was a vice-president of the United Kingdom Alliance for many years and was an influential member of the Birmingham Temperance Society. He was also an active promoter of the Blue Ribbon campaign.

Later in life, Cadbury devoted himself to philanthropy, championing the development of hospitals, savings banks, and facilities for the blind.

=== Personal life and death ===
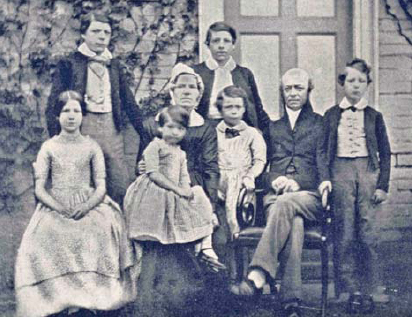
Cadbury family photo, 1847

Cadbury married twice. He married Priscilla Ann Dymond (1799–1828), in 1826, but she died two years later. In Lancaster on 24 July 1832 he married his second wife, Candia Barrow (Lancaster, 1805–1855), daughter of George Barrow and wife Elizabeth Pumphrey, and had seven children: John (1834–1866), Richard (1835–1899), Maria (1838–1908), George (1839–1922), Joseph (1841–1841), Edward (1843–1866), and Henry (1845–1875).

Cadbury died at his home in Edgbaston, on 11 May 1889. He was buried at Witton Cemetery, Birmingham.

=== Legacy ===
During his lifetime, Cadbury dreamed of creating a model village. In 1879, Richard and George relocated the Cadbury factory from the centre of town to an area of what was then north Worcestershire, on the borders of the parishes of Northfield and King's Norton centred on the 18th-century Bournbrook Hall, where they developed the model village of Bournville; now a major suburb of Birmingham.

In accordance with Cadbury's teetotal heritage, Bourneville has been dry for over 100 years, with no alcohol being sold in pubs, bars or shops. Residents have fought to maintain this, winning a court battle in March 2007 with Britain's biggest supermarket chain Tesco, to prevent it selling alcohol in its local outlet.
