= Woodbrooke Quaker Study Centre =

Quaker college in Selly Oak, Birmingham, England

Coordinates: 52.4311°N 1.9481°W

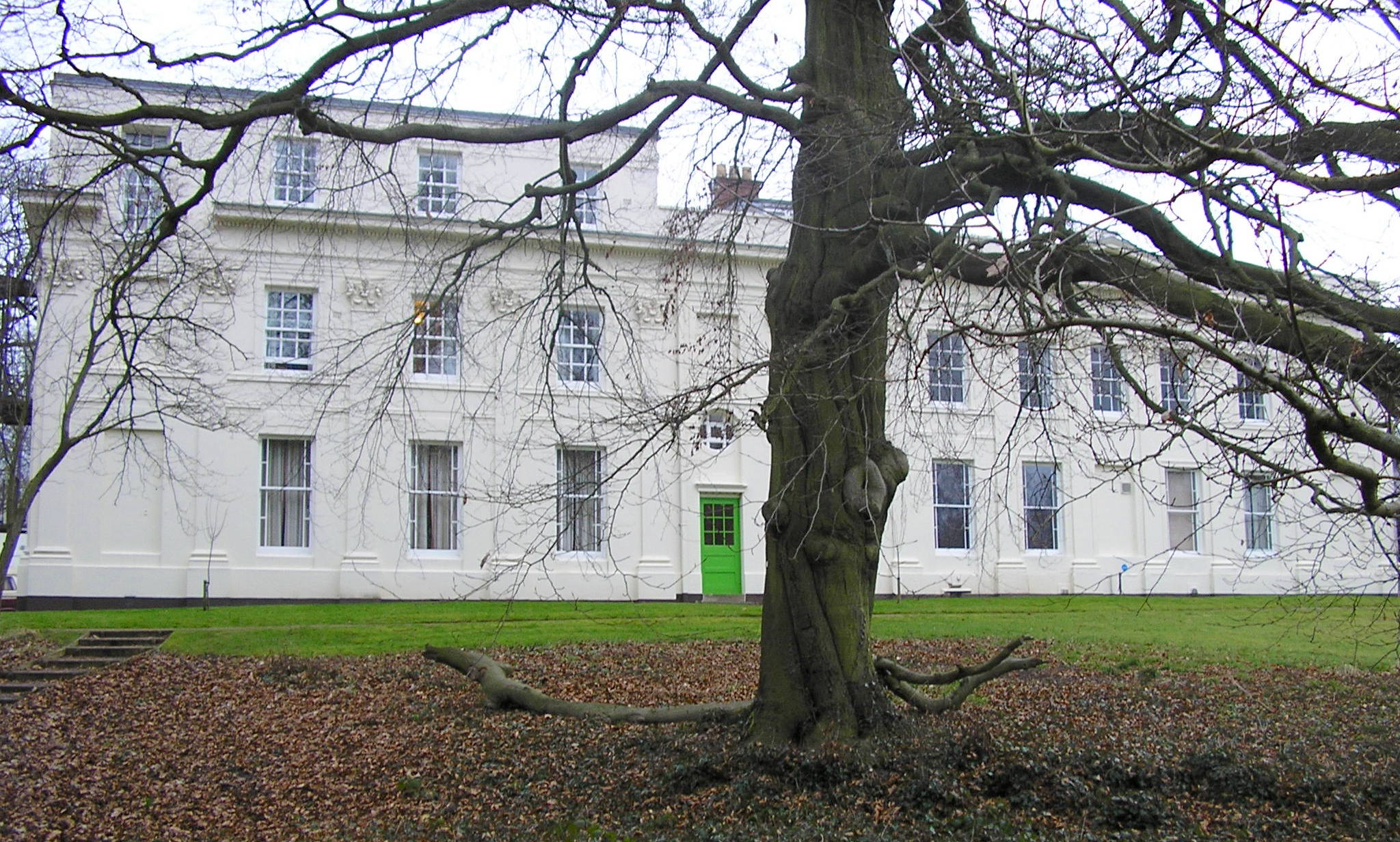
Main building.

Woodbrooke Quaker Study Centre is a Quaker community and educational organization, offering online courses and worship, Master's degrees through the University of Birmingham, and in-person retreats and events in various venues. It was formerly based at a conference facility in Selly Oak, Birmingham, England, which closed in 2023.

== Founding and history ==
The only Quaker Study Centre in Europe, it was founded by George Cadbury in 1903 and occupied one of his former properties on Bristol Road. Woodbrooke's first Director of Studies was the biblical scholar J. Rendel Harris. Other early staff included Horace Gundry Alexander and Leyton Richards, a prominent pacifist who was appointed as Warden in 1916.

The college was extended between 1907 and 1914 by the addition of a new wing, a new common room and Holland House, a men's hostel. By 1922 it was estimated that 1,250 British students and 400 foreign students had attended the college.

It was federated with eight other nearby colleges, including Fircroft College, Prospect Hall, and Westhill College, known collectively as Selly Oak Colleges until the federation ended with the closure of Westhill in 2001.

== Closure of conference centre ==
In February 2023, facing budget pressures due to falling student and conference bookings together with increased costs in maintaining the building, Woodbrooke’s trustees announced that they would be giving up the site in Selly Oak; in-person events at the college were gradually wound down following this announcement, and on 31 October 2023 the site closed to the public for the last time. The following day custodianship of the building transferred to the Bournville Village Trust.

The Woodbrooke organisation continues to provide short courses on personal spiritual growth, theology, creative arts, and training for Quaker roles through a model combining online learning with distributed in-person events in local Quaker meetings and other venues. Its Centre for Research in Quaker Studies offers postgraduate taught and research degrees through the Universities of Birmingham.

== Notable alumni ==
- Gertrud Luckner, Christian social worker involved in the German resistance to Nazism
- Alice Paul, American suffragist, feminist, and women's rights activist
- Margaret Thorp, Australian feminist and peace activist
- Hélène Monastier, Swiss peace activist
