= List of Zeppelins shot down over the United Kingdom in World War I =

Airships made about 51 bombing raids on Britain during World War I. These killed 557 and injured another 1,358 people. More than 5,000 bombs were dropped (largely on towns and cities) across Britain, causing £1.5 million (equivalent to £112,800,000 in 2025) in damage. 84 airships took part, of which 30 were shot down or lost in accidents.

Airships shot down over the United Kingdom during World War I
Shot down	Tactical No	Production No	Shot down by	Aircraft	Squadron	Serial Number	Crash location	Picture
1 April 1916	L 15	LZ 48	Combination of Ranken darts dropped by Alfred Brandon and Anti-Aircraft Fire	B.E.2e & ground fire	No. 19 Reserve Aeroplane Squadron and Dartford AA battery		Kentish Knock, Thames estuary	
3 September 1916	SL 11		Lt Leefe Robinson	B.E.2c	No. 39 Home Defence Squadron	2693	Cuffley, Hertfordshire	
24 September 1916	L 32	LZ 74	2nd Lt Frederick Sowrey	B.E.2c	No. 39 Home Defence Squadron	4112	Great Burstead, Essex	
24 September 1916	L 33	LZ 76	Alfred Brandon	B.E.2e fighter	No. 39 Home Defence Squadron	4112	Little Wigborough, Essex	
2 October 1916	L 31	LZ 72	2nd Lt Wulstan J. Tempest	B.E.2c	No. 39 Home Defence Squadron	4557	Potter's Bar, Hertfordshire	
27 November 1916	L 34	LZ 78	2nd Lt Ian Pyot	B.E.2c	No. 36 Home Defence Squadron	2738	Hartlepool, County Durham	
28 November 1916	L 21	LZ 61	Flt Lt Egbert 'Bertie' Cadbury	B.E.2c	RNAS Great Yarmouth	8265	Sea	
14 May 1917	L 22	LZ 64	Flight Sub-Lieutenant Robert Leckie	Curtiss H12	RNAS Great Yarmouth	8666	Sea	
17 June 1917	L 48	LZ 95	2nd Lt Loudon Pierce Watkins	B.E.12	No. 37 Home Defence Squadron	6110	Theberton, East Suffolk	
21 August 1917	L 23	LZ 66	2nd Lt Bernard A. Smart	Sopwith Pup	HMS Yarmouth cruiser	-	Sea	
10 May 1918	L 62	LZ 107	Capt T.C. Pattinson	Felixstowe F2A	-	N4291	Sea	
6 August 1918	L 70	LZ 112	Captain Robert Leckie	Airco DH.4	RNAS Great Yarmouth	-	Sea	
11 August 1918	L 53	LZ 100	Flight Sub-Lieutenant Stuart D Culley	Sopwith Camel	HMS Redoubt destroyer	N6812	Sea	
