= Zeppelin LZ 66 =

German Navy airship shot down in 1917

LZ 66
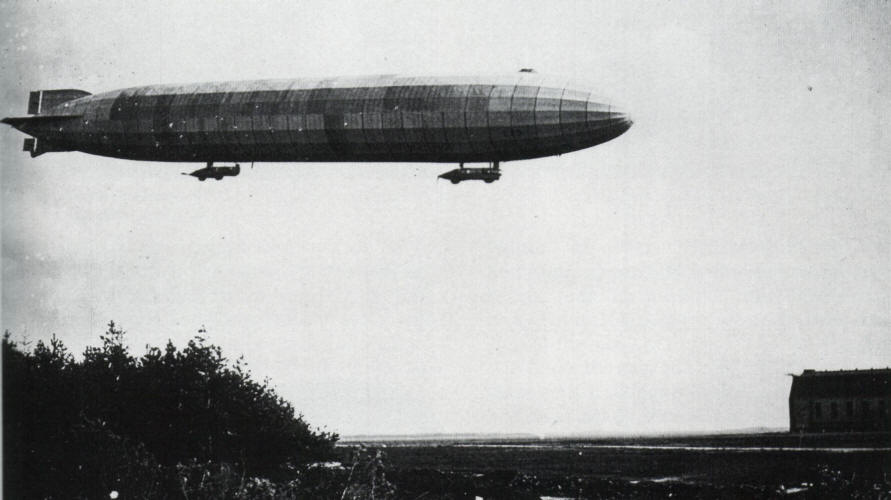
- Zeppelin LZ 66 / L 23 taking the Norwegian ship Royal as a war prize.

General information
- Type: improved L-Class reconnaissance airship
- National origin: Germany
- Manufacturer: Luftschiffbau Zeppelin at Staaken
- Primary user: Kaiserliche Marine
- Number built: 1

History
- First flight: 8 April 1916

Zeppelin LZ 66, Imperial German Navy serial L 23, took part in 51 reconnaissance missions during World War I and on 21 August 1917 it was shot down by Second Lt Bernard A. Smart, flying a Sopwith Pup.

== Career ==
During WWI it took part in three attacks on England dropping 5,254 kg (11,583 lb) of bombs.

=== Bombing Boston 2/3. September 1916 ===
On the night of 2-3 September 1916, L 23 from the base in Nordholz with the officers Ganzel and Rothe participated in World War I's largest bombing raid against England, involving a total of 12 Navy and four of the Army airships. L 23 threw seven bombs over the Boston area of Lincolnshire, with six hitting the town and one hitting Wyberton 3km southwest, causing one death.

=== Boarding of Royal ===
On 23 April 1917, L 23 intercepted the Norwegian ship Royal on the North Sea 85 nautical miles (157.42 km) off the Bovbjerg Lighthouse. They were able to stop the ship by dropping a bomb right in front of it, forcing its Norwegian crew to board the lifeboats. The airship then proceeded to gently hover above one lifeboat, whereupon Commander Bockholt demanded the ship's papers and sent an officer and 5 sailors over to the vessel to investigate if the cargo ship was carrying contraband in violation of Norwegian neutrality. Royal was indeed illegally carrying timber to England, namely pit props destined for West Hartlepool. This discovery allowed the legal confiscation of the ship as a prize of war.

A swiftly selected boarding party consisting of boatman Bernhard Wiesemann, chief mate Ernst Fegert and chief mate Friedrich Engelke took over the sailing ship. The Norwegian crew was initially locked in their quarters, but when the Germans struggled to maneuver the ship's sail, the crew were set free and ordered to sail the barque to Cuxhaven, where they arrived after 43 hours. There the navy confiscated and sold Royal, who then went on to serve with various German shipping companies both during and after the war until the ship in 1924 sold for scrap.

This action was quite an achievement and boosted morale of the Zeppelin corps, but it annoyed the German command as it put the Zeppelin at considerable risk for little reward, and instructions were given to not repeat the capture.

== Destruction ==
On 21 August 1917, L 23 was observed at a distance by a northbound squadron of four smaller cruisers and 15 destroyers, having participated in an English mine laying operation off White Sands that morning. At the height of Søndervig, the squadron turned to the wind and held its course for a few miles, after which a Sopwith Pup aircraft, piloted by Bernard A. Smart, launched from HMS Yarmouth, which was equipped with a launching platform.

As soon as the Pup was launched, L 23 tried to avoid engagement, but Smart managed to attain 9,000 feet (2.7 km), flying at 110 miles per hour (180 km/h), descending to 6,000 feet (1,800 m) to engage L 23 at high speed, firing incendiary rounds into the Airship. Smart levelled off and saw that the stern of the zeppelin was ablaze, with the zeppelin at 45° nose high. The flames quickly spread up L 23, leaving only the nose intact when it hit the ocean.

A single crew member, presumably the top gunner from the front of the airship, initially saved his life by parachute but drowned as there was no rescue ship nearby, 40 kilometres (25 mi) off Stadil Fjord. No one from L 23 survived and the body of sailor Johan Schüttrup was found on 3 September 1917 on Vigsø Strand, being buried in Vigsø cemetery. It was written that he died for his German fatherland on his tombstone.

A heavily decomposed corpse, which was found in Jens Enevaldsens Strandlen in Søndervig on 15 September 1917 and was buried at Ny Sogn cemetery was reasonably identified as machine sailor Johannes / Hans Buhr, from a name-plate found with the body. In his graveyard in Harboøre, he has erected a tombstone in his honour. Many other unidentified corpses drifted ashore on the west coast during the time that may have been crew from L 23.

Pilot Bernard Arthur Smart ditched his Pup near two British destroyers and was rescued. Smart made a similar flight from HMS Yarmouth 11 months later when he led the air raid on 19 July 1918 on the zeppelin base at Tondern which destroyed LZ 99 and LZ 108.

== See also ==
- List of Zeppelins

== Bibliography ==
Notes

References

- Bruce, J.M. (1 January 1954). "The Sopwith Pup: Historic Military Aircraft No 6". Flight. Iliffe and Sons Ltd. pp. 8–12. ISSN 0015-3710. OCLC 6674288. Archived from the original on 14 February 2009.
- "Lot 937 7th March 2007". Dix Noonan Webb. 7 March 2007.
- Fegan, Thomas (2013). The Baby Killers: German Air Raids on Britain in the First World War. Pen and Sword. ISBN 9780850528930.
- Guttman, Jon & Illustrated by Simon Smith, Harry Dempsey, Richard Chasemore, Peter Bull (2012). Sopwith Camel: Air Vanguard. Bloomsbury Publishing. ISBN 9781780961774.
- War Monthly (1979). "Zeppelin captured merchant ship but annoyed German Top Brass". War Monthly. No. 71–78. London: Marshall Cavendish Ltd. ISSN 0307-2886.
