= Naval gunfire support =

Use of naval artillery to provide fire support

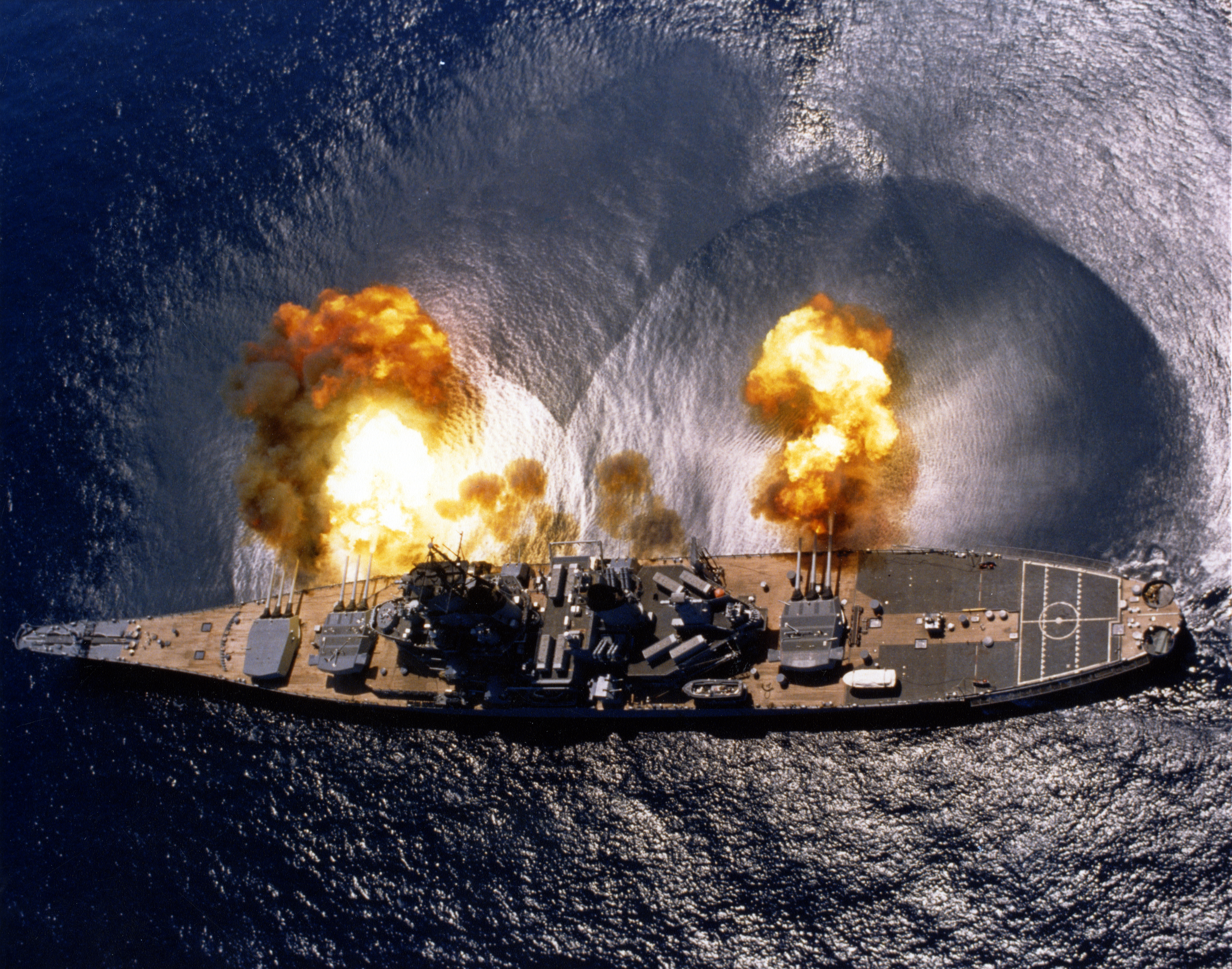
USS Iowa fires a full broadside of nine 16 in/50 and six 5 in/38 guns during a target exercise near Vieques Island, Puerto Rico, 1 July 1984.

Naval gunfire support (NGFS), also known as naval surface fire support (NSFS), or shore bombardment, is the use of naval artillery to provide fire support for amphibious assault and other troops operating within their range. NGFS is one of several disciplines encompassed by the term naval fires. Modern naval gunfire support is one of the three main components of amphibious warfare assault operations support, along with aircraft and ship-launched land-attack missiles. Shipborne guns have been used against shore defences since medieval naval warfare.

== Tactics ==
Naval gunfire support is classified into two types: direct fire, where the ship has line of sight with the target (either visually or through the use of radar), and indirect fire, which, to be accurate, requires an artillery observer to adjust fire.

When on the gun line, ships are particularly vulnerable to attack from aircraft coming from a landward direction and flying low to avoid radar detection, or from submarines because of a predictable and steady (non-evasive) course.

== History ==
An early use of shore bombardment was during the Siege of Calais in 1347 when Edward III of England deployed ships carrying bombards and other artillery.

=== Ottoman-Habsburg Wars ===
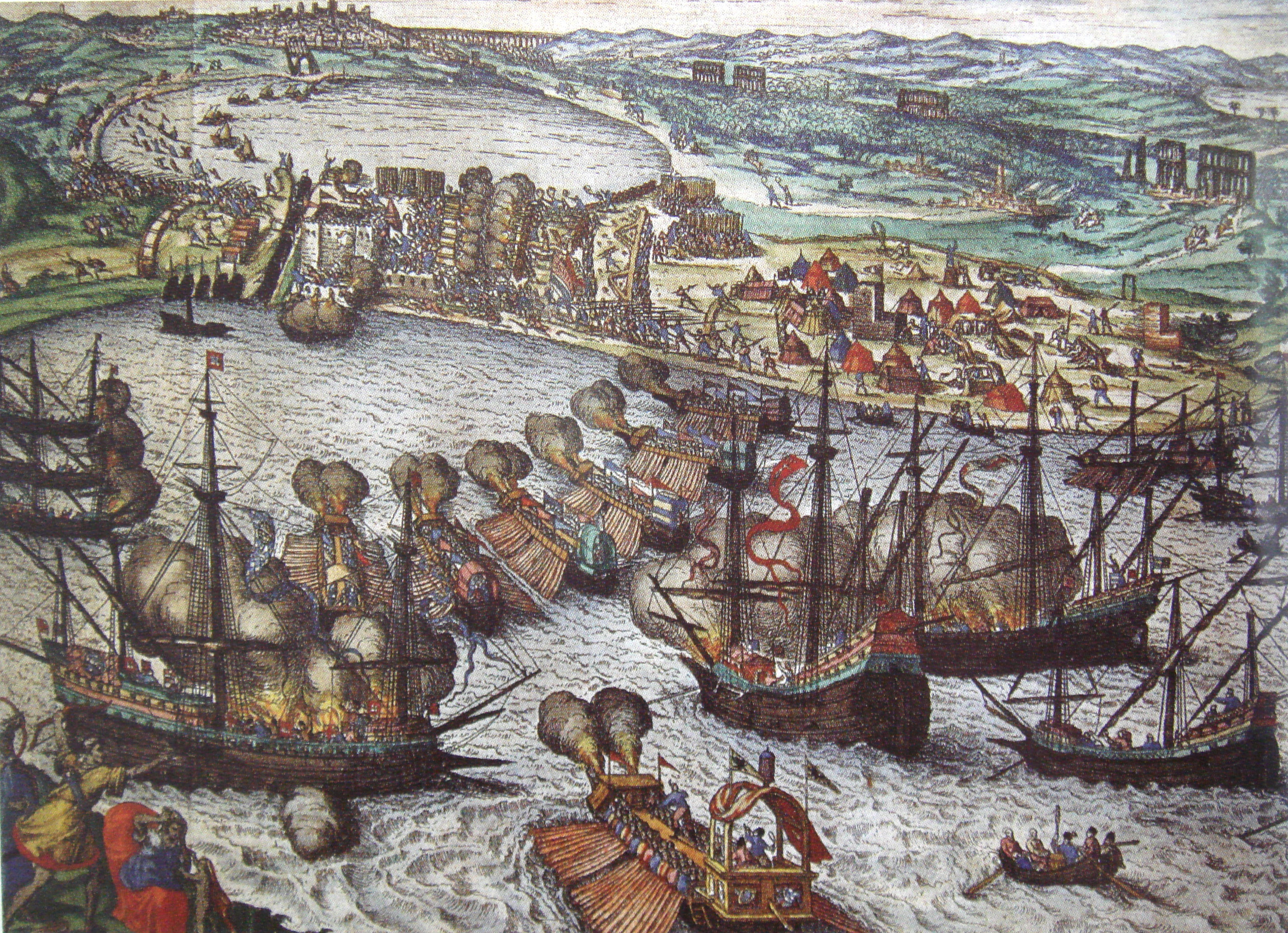
Bombardement of La Goulette in 1535.

The Spanish made a wide usage of naval bombardments in the wars of the Mediterranean, with an early example featuring rudimentary armored ships in the capture of Mers-el-Kébir of 1505. During the reign of Holy Roman Emperor Charles V, the conquest of Coron of 1532 by admiral Andrea Doria employed a massive concentrations of gunfire from anchored sailing ships and mobile galleys to cover amphibious action. It made usage of the great carrack Santa Anna and other warships, complemented light guns placed in their rigging to achieve better fire angles.

The conquest of Tunis in 1535, directed by Doria and Álvaro de Bazán the Elder, also emploed extensively naval gunfire to cover the advance of ground troops and weaken the enemy positions. It featured the Santa Anna along with the bigger Portuguese galleon São João Baptista, with the assistance of galleys to tow them into position. They guns also proved able to outrange the Ottoman terrestrial artillery even whenever they could not approach safely. The fortress of La Goulette was eventually taken by way of a massive collective bombardment, which caused part of the building to collapse.

Gunfire support from galleys was also used by Doria in the relief of Nice, allowing to disembark their land forces directly on the Franco-Ottoman positions. Another special class of vessel known as floating battery was devised by García de Toledo to bombard the shore during the capture of Mahdia in 1550. It was build over the hulls of two galleys. A regular naval bombardment from sailing ships was also used by Luis Fajardo to cover a desembark in skiffs during the raid on Tunis of 1609. The ships also served as decoys to attract the enemy fire from La Goulette.

=== 16th to 18th centuries ===
Álvaro de Bazán the Younger also used the artillery of galleasses to cover the desembarking of galleys and landing craft in the conquest of the Azores in 1583. The Spanish used again artillery from galleasses to cover the assault and capture of Blavet during the French Wars of Religion.

An early type of vessel designed for the purpose of shore bombardment was the bomb vessel, which came into use during the 17th century. The burning of Falmouth by the Royal Navy was among the grievances of the United States Declaration of Independence. These were small ships whose main armament was one or two large mortars that fired explosive shells at a high angle. They were typically poor sailing craft that were of limited use outside their specialized role. However, small vessels armed with large mortars saw use as late as the American Civil War, when the Union Navy used them in several attacks on coastal fortifications.

During the 18th century, naval gunfire was used by the Spanish to cover their disembark during the 1732 conquest of Oran, successfully disrupting the Algerian squads. A generation later, Antonio Barceló developed the usage of artillery mounted on xebecs and small boats to bombard enemy positions along the coast, which proved highly effective during the 1775 invasion of Algiers, in which they covered the infantry's advance and put the Algerian cavalry to flight. The expedition failed in the face of the local resistance, which made his naval division even more critical for covering the troops' re-embarkation.

Barceló's late gunboats, along with floating batteries built by the French, were used during the Great Siege of Gibraltar (1779–1782). During the Napoleonic Wars, the Royal Navy commissioned several vessels of the Musquito class and Firm class. These carried either naval long guns or carronades. Floating batteries were used by the French and British during the Crimean War and by both sides during the American Civil War.

=== World War I ===
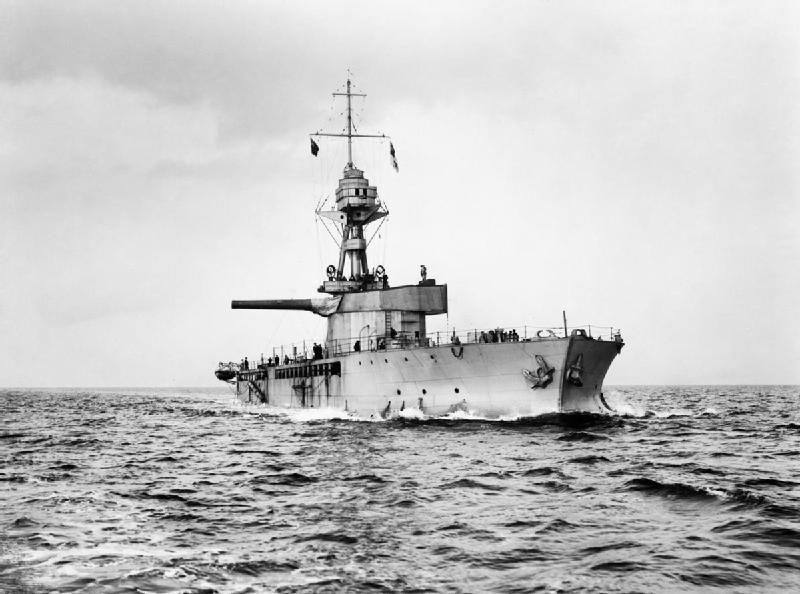
The monitor HMS Marshal Ney, with her single turret trained to starboard (1915)

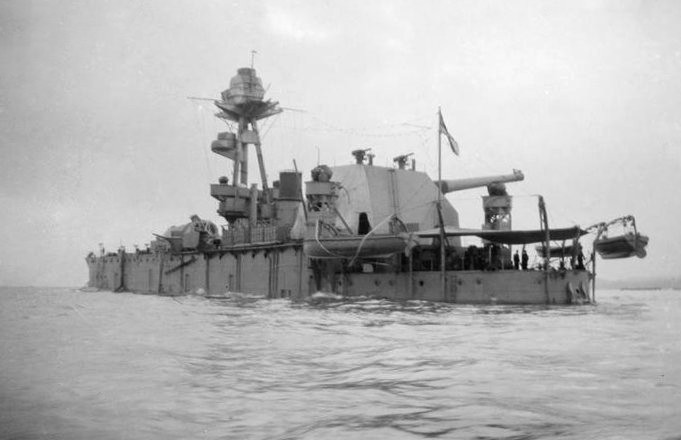
Stern view of HMS Lord Clive, her 18-inch gun is fitted on a fixed mounting on her quarterdeck, pointing to starboard (November 1918)

During World War I, the principal practitioner of naval bombardment (the term used prior to World War II for what was later designated naval gunfire support (NGFS)) was Britain's Royal Navy (RN); and the main theatres in which RN ships fired against targets ashore were the Aegean—Dardanelles/Gallipoli, and later the Salonika front—and along the Belgian coast.

In the Aegean the enemy coastal defences (forts, shore-batteries etc.) were fairly unsophisticated; however, on the Gallipoli peninsula these still proved to be difficult targets for the navy's low angle firing guns. Here, the fortress outlines tended to blend into the hillside making identification difficult, and the guns presented small targets. Mobile howitzers on the plateau presented even greater problems, since these were higher still, and being completely shielded from view proved almost impervious to naval bombardment.

For RN ships bombarding German targets along the Belgian coast the situation was altogether different from the autumn of 1915 until the enemy withdrawal in October 1918. For this role, the Royal Navy frequently made use of specially designed vessels known as monitors. They carried extremely heavy armament for their size, often a single turret from a decommissioned battleship. With a broad-beamed hull designed for stability and a shallow draft to allow close approach to the shore, the vessels were slow and thus unsuitable for naval combat. Two Lord Clive-class monitors were fitted with BL 18-inch Mk I naval guns, the largest guns ever used by the Royal Navy.

The Germans constructed an extensive, well-equipped and well-coordinated system of gun batteries to defend the coast—and especially the ports of Ostend and Zeebrugge. Those ports, and the canals linking them to Bruges, were of major importance to the U-boat campaign in the North Sea and English Channel—and for that reason were frequently bombarded by RN monitors operating from Dover and Dunkirk.

The RN continually advanced their technology and techniques necessary to conduct effective bombardments in the face of the German defenders—firstly refining spotting/correction by aircraft (following initial efforts during the Dardanelles/Gallipoli campaign), then experimenting with night bombardment and moving on to adopt indirect fire (in which a ship can accurately engage an unseen target, which may be several miles inland) as the norm for day and night firings.

In the summer of 1918, monitors were equipped with gyro director training (GDT) gear—which effectively provided the director with a gyro-stabilised artificial line of sight, and thereby enabled a ship to carry out indirect bombardment while underway. This was a very significant advance which basically established a firm foundation for naval bombardment as practiced by the RN and USN during the Second World War.

Between 1919–39 all RN battleships/battlecruisers and all new-construction cruisers were equipped with Admiralty Fire Control Tables and GDT gear, and from the early 1930s (probably earlier) were required to carry out "live" bombardment practice once in each commission. In 1939, therefore, the RN was quite well prepared for this particular aspect of joint warfare.

=== World War II ===
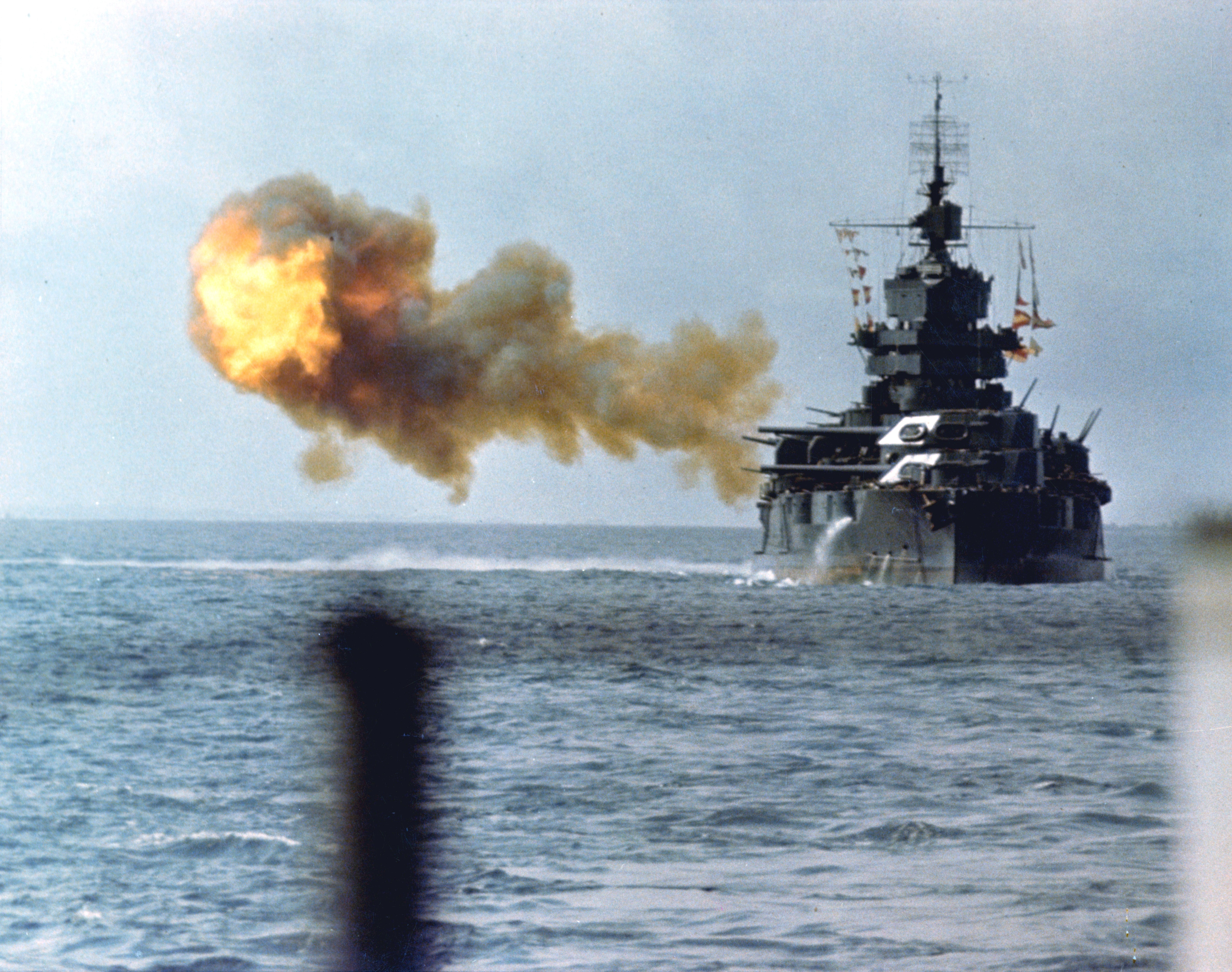
The WWI-era (launched 30 June 1917) United States Navy battleship USS Idaho shells Japanese defenses on Okinawa on 1 April 1945.

Indirect bombardment reached its zenith during World War II, when the availability of man-portable radio systems and sophisticated relay networks allowed forward observers to transmit targeting information and provide almost instant accuracy reports once troops had landed. Battleships, cruisers (including Bobtail cruisers, designed to support amphibious operations), and destroyers would pound shore installations, sometimes for days, in the hope of reducing fortifications and weakening defending forces. Obsolete battleships unfit for combat against other ships were often used as floating gun platforms expressly for this purpose. However, given the relatively primitive nature of the fire control computers and radar of the era combined with the high velocity of naval gunfire, accuracy depended upon designated observer aircraft until troops landed and were able to radio back reports to the ship. Observation seaplanes proved vulnerable to land-based fighter aircraft during the invasion of Sicily so gunfire observers flew Spitfires in support of the Normandy landings.

The solution was to engage in longer bombardment periods—up to two weeks, in some cases—saturating target areas with fire until a lucky few shells had destroyed the intended targets. This alerted an enemy that a landing attack was imminent. In the Pacific War this mattered less, where the isolated defenders of island strongholds expected to be invaded at some point and had already committed whatever combat resources were available. The Japanese used battleships only once for shore bombardment, when two battleships bombarded United States Marines at Guadalcanal's Henderson Airfield in October 1942, inflicting minor damage. Bombardment periods were usually shorter in the European theatre, where surprise was more often valued, overland reinforcement far more likely, and ships' guns were responding to the movements of mobile defenders, not whittling away at static fortifications.

Naval gunfire could reach as far as 20 miles (32 km) inland and was often used to supplement land-based artillery. Naval gunfire was used extensively throughout Normandy, although initially the surprise nature of the landings precluded a drawn-out bombardment which could have reduced the Atlantic Wall defences sufficiently.

=== Late 20th century ===
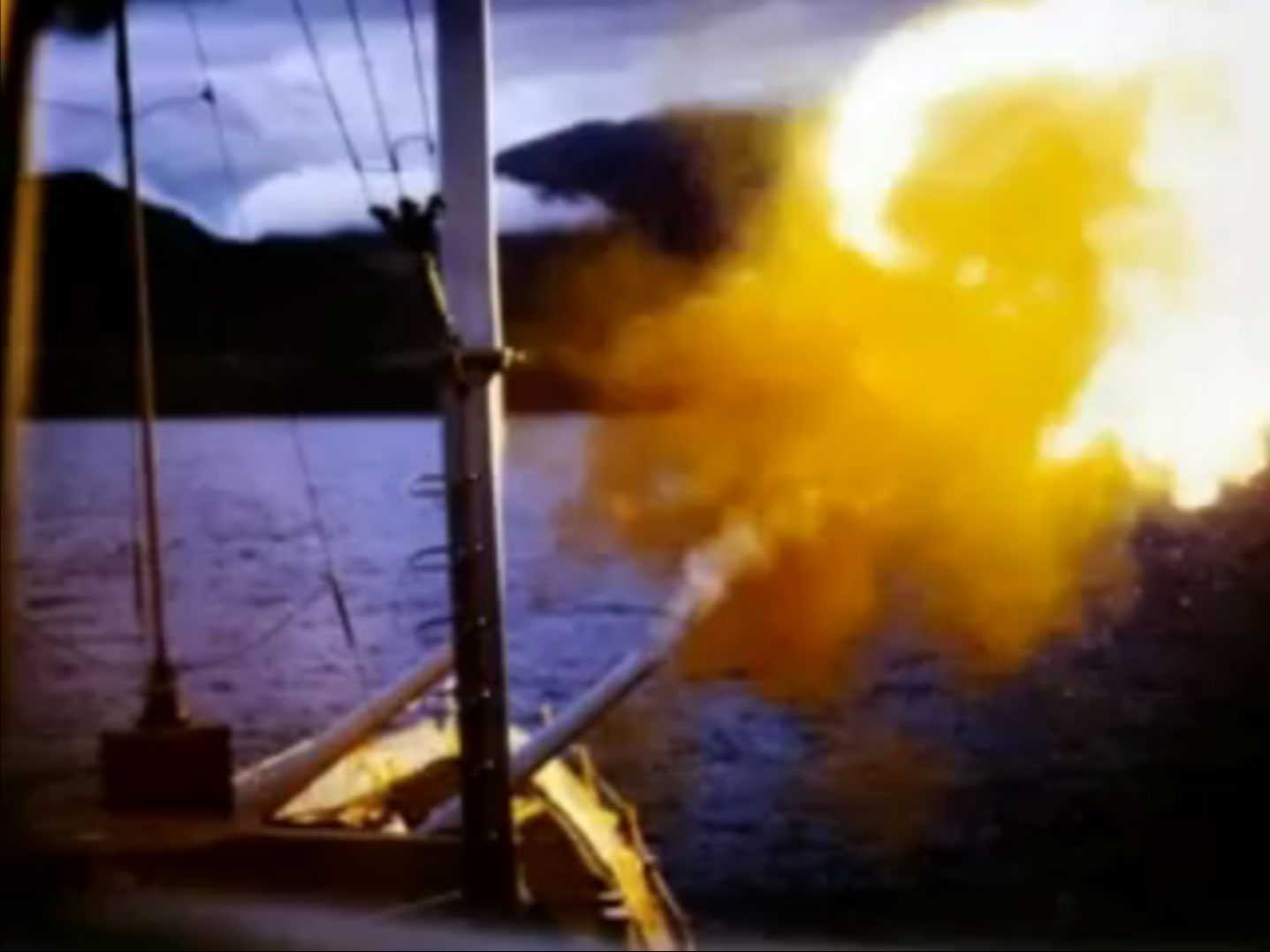
USS Hanson's forward gun mount firing at enemy target during Vietnam war (1972). Hanson fired 14,486 rounds of 5"/38 ammunition at enemy positions and assorted targets in 1972 against heavy enemy opposition.

Naval gunfire support played a critical role in the Korean War; the conflict was ideal for this type of service, with much of the fighting taking place along the coast of the Korean Peninsula. The battleship USS New Jersey and light cruiser HMS Belfast provided heavy support, along with numerous light cruisers and destroyers. In particular were so-called "Trainbuster" patrols, working with spotter aircraft to destroy North Korean supply trains, as well as railway bridges and tunnels.

In 1961, the annexation of Goa by Indian naval gunfire support was provided by the Indian Navy's cruisers, destroyers, and frigates in support of Indian Army operations.

During the Vietnam War, Task Unit 70.8.9, the U.S. Naval Gunfire Support Unit, was made up of destroyers armed with 5-inch/38 caliber or 5-inch/54 caliber guns, and continuously patrolled the coast of South Vietnam to provide NGFS at short notice. If greater firepower was required then larger gunned cruisers were called in for reinforcements, along with the battleship USS New Jersey for a single tour of duty. NGFS was controlled by the United States Marines Corps First Air Naval Gunfire Liaison Company which provided spotters, usually airborne in light aircraft but sometimes on foot, in all military regions.

During the Falklands War, naval gunfire support for the British Armed Forces of the British Task Force was utilized by British ships of the same British Task Force during numerous battles. These battles included, but were not limited to; Battle of Two Sisters (HMS Glamorgan (D19)'s twin 4.5-inch (114 mm) guns provided support) and the Battle of Mount Kent (naval gunfire support provided by HMS Yarmouth), both battles took place on the night of 11-12 June, 1982.

During the Multinational Force in Lebanon, naval gunfire support was provided on several occasions by destroyers, cruisers, and New Jersey assigned to coastal patrol. They supported the US Marines as well as the Lebanese Army. In 1991, during Operation Desert Storm the battleships USS Missouri and USS Wisconsin fired Tomahawk cruise missiles along with their main battery guns against Iraqi targets in the Euphrates Delta. This was the last firing of battleship guns during war, as well as the first use of drone aircraft to observe targets and give targeting corrections. In the 2003 invasion of Iraq, NGFS was used in support of operations on the Al-Faw peninsula in the early stages of the war by Royal Navy and Royal Australian Navy frigates.

=== 21st century ===
As part of Operation Enduring Freedom - Horn of Africa, on 1 June 2007, the American destroyer USS Chafee shelled jihadist positions at Bargal, Somalia.

Naval gunfire occurred multiple times during the First and Second Libyan Civil War. During Operation Unified Protector in 2011 in Libya, allied forces provided gun naval support to rebel forces. The French Navy fired approximately 3,000 76 and 100 mm (3.0 and 3.9 in) shells against military targets (the warships Jean Bart, La Fayette, Forbin, Chevalier Paul). Also, during the Battle of Sirte in 2016, the destroyer USS Carney conducted shore bombardments of ISIS positions as part of Operation Odyssey Lightning.

==== Continued naval gunfire support training ====
Despite the reduction in calibre size to 5-inch (127 mm) guns, even ground-based NATO forces' artillery observers and Forward Air Controllers are taught the rudiments of calling in and adjusting naval gunfire. With the exception of a few procedures, the controlling principles are quite similar in both land and naval bombardment. Shore fire control parties participate in field operations, often with a Marine artillery battery to provide simulated naval gunfire support. When available, Marine spotters will call the fire missions for naval ships undergoing their gunnery qualification tests, to provide both parties the opportunity to practice their skills. One use of naval gunfire in modern operations is to provide Suppression of Enemy Air Defenses for close air support. Well-timed salvos provide covering fire for sorties and prevent enemy troops and batteries from effectively using anti-aircraft weapons.

==== United States ====
Naval gunfire is still used for many of its traditional purposes. In the Marine Corps, artillery units have several naval gunfire liaison officers (NGLO, pronounced "no-glow") in each battalion to maintain close contact with the Navy for amphibious operations. The NGLO is responsible for the Shore Fire Control Party and works in the Fire Control Center with other liaison officers to coordinate naval gunfire with close air support, mortars, and howitzers. The NGLO joins the others in the planning of fire missions in support of the Marine Infantry Regiment.

The Marine Corps maintains three active (1st, 2nd, & 5th) and three reserve (3rd, 4th & 6th) Air Naval Gunfire Liaison Company (ANGLICO) units. ANGLICO members are temporarily assigned to combat units of the United States and foreign nations that lack inherent fire support capability, such as naval gunfire. The ships equipped with the large caliber guns of the early and middle of the 20th century have all been decommissioned. The last American battleship, USS Missouri, was decommissioned in 31 March 1992, which left no naval guns larger than 5 inches (127 mm) in service on any active warship in the United States Navy until the introduction of the Zumwalt class with the 155 mm (6.1 inch) Advanced Gun System (however these larger guns are functionally inoperable because no ammunition was purchased for them). The aircraft carrier and sea to land missile have been used instead. The remaining naval artillery typically has more advanced targeting systems than the older large-caliber artillery.

Within the U.S. there was a long debate over the role naval gunfire support should play in warfare. This took on a greater sense of urgency with the removal of the last two battleships from the Naval Vessel Register.

== See also ==
- US Field artillery team
- 148 (Meiktila) Battery Royal Artillery
