= Peter Strasser =

German aviation leader

- Peter Strasser during WWI
- Born: 1 April 1876; Hanover, Kingdom of Prussia
- Died: 5 August 1918 (aged 42) near Wells-next-the-Sea, Norfolk, England
- Military career
- Allegiance: German Empire
- Branch: Imperial German Navy
- Service years: 1891–1918
- Rank: Kapitän zur See (Captain)
- Unit: Marine-Luftschiff-Abteilung
- Commands: Führer der Luftschiffe (F.d.L.)
- Conflicts: World War I
- Awards: Pour le Mérite; Iron Cross First class

Peter Strasser (1 April 1876 – 5 August 1918) was chief commander of German Imperial Navy Zeppelins during World War I, the main force operating bombing campaigns from 1915 to 1917. He was killed when flying the German Empire's last airship raid over the United Kingdom.

== Early career ==
Strasser was born in Hanover, Germany, on 1 April 1876. At the age of 15, he joined the German Imperial Navy (Kaiserliche Marine). After serving on board SMS Stein and SMS Moltke, he entered the Naval academy in Kiel. He quickly rose through the ranks and was promoted to Lieutenant in 1895. He served on board SMS Mars, SMS Blücher, SMS Panther, SMS Mecklenburg and SMS Westfalen from 1897 to 1902. He was an excellent gunnery officer and was placed in the German Imperial Naval Office (Reichsmarine-Amt) in charge of German shipboard and coastal artillery. In September 1913, he took command of the Naval Airship Division (Marine-Luftschiff-Abteilung). Airships were as yet an unproven technology and Korvettenkapitän Strasser became the new naval airship chief after his predecessor, Korvettenkapitän Friedrich Metzing, drowned in the crash of the very first naval airship, the L 1. Also the single remaining naval airship L 2 was soon lost in another fatal accident. Strasser completed theoretical studies on airships and gained practical experience piloting the civilian airship LZ 17 Sachsen. Another airship, LZ 13 Hansa was chartered to train naval crews while new ships were being built. At the start of the war Navy had only one airship operational, the LZ 24 (Navy designation L 3). L 3, under Strasser's personal command, was the only one to participate in the Imperial Navy manoeuvres just before the war.

== First World War ==
Following the outbreak of World War I in August 1914, Navy airships were initially confined to anti-submarine, anti-mine and naval scouting missions. They served in the Battle of Heligoland Bight. This was the strategy of Admiral Hugo von Pohl, the navy's chief of staff, who was aware of their value to the surface fleet and that there were only six naval airships operational at that time. Shortly after the outbreak of war, Konteradmiral Paul Behncke, Pohl's deputy, had submitted a memorandum suggesting that the Zeppelins be used to bomb London and the British naval bases; the proposal was strongly backed by Strasser, but von Pohl resisted the idea until it gained the support of Grossadmiral Alfred von Tirpitz, the State Secretary of the Navy and the creator of the High Seas Fleet. Following the approval of the Kaiser, with certain caveats, Strasser prepared a plan to attack port facilities in England.

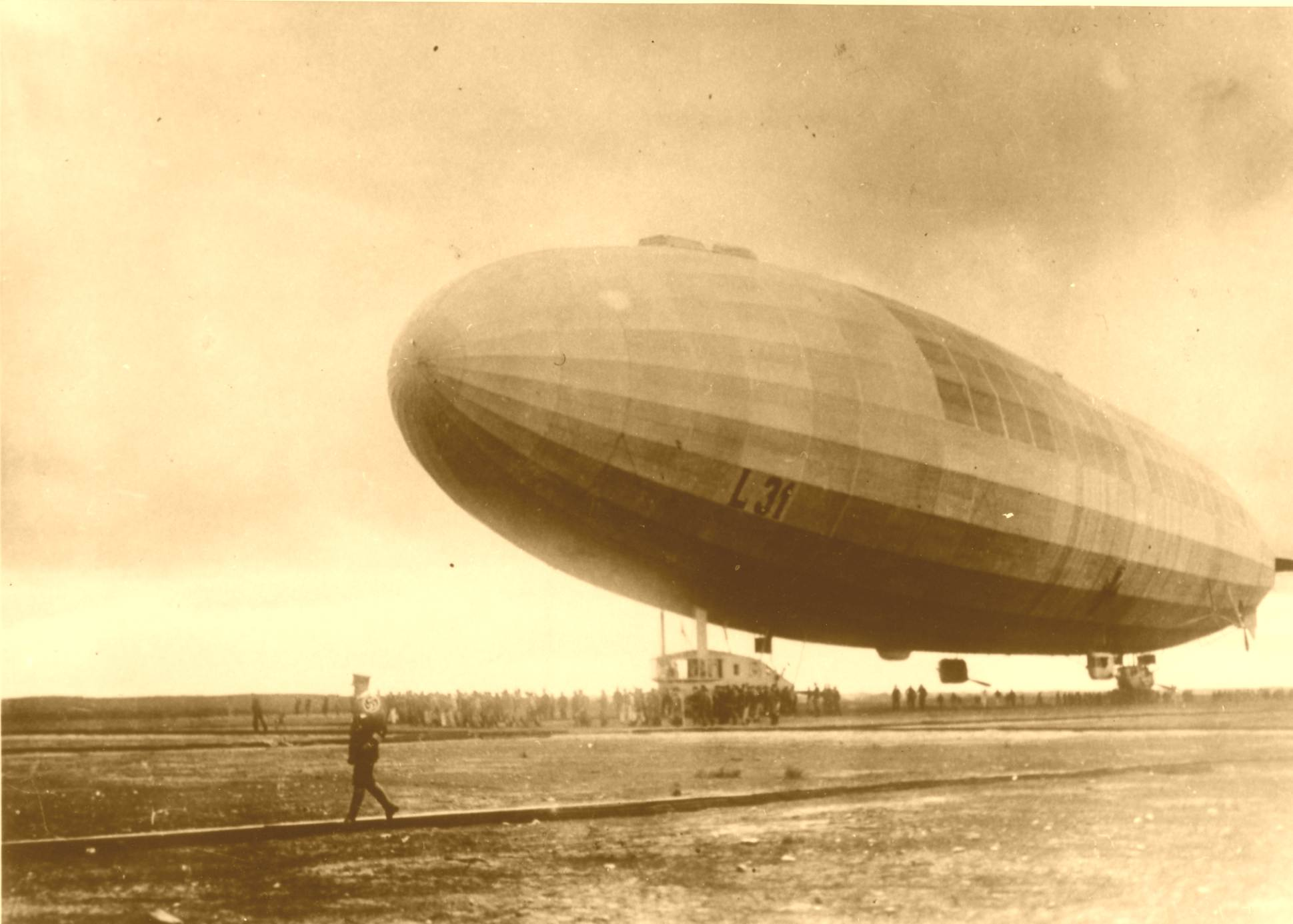
Zeppelin LZ 72 (L 31) being manoeuvred on the ground with Peter Strasser pacing in the foreground.

On 19–20 January 1915, L3 and L4 participated in the first bombing raids over England, attacking Great Yarmouth, Sheringham and King's Lynn. Over the next 3 years, bombing campaigns would be launched primarily against Britain, but also on Paris and other cities and ports. Strasser would participate in the England raids at least once a month. He decided to test the newly developed spy basket himself, and almost fell out when it became entangled with the Zeppelin's aerial. Initially, bombing was limited to military targets but with great lobbying support of Konteradmiral Behncke, the Kaiser approved attacks against civilian targets. Official British estimates list 498 civilians and 58 soldiers killed by air attack in Britain between 1915 and 1918. 1,913 injuries are recorded. The Imperial Navy dropped 360,000 kg of bombs, the majority on the British Isles. 307,315 kg were directed at enemy vessels, ports and towns; 58,000 kg were dropped over Italy, the Baltic and the Mediterranean. German army airships carried 160,000 kg of bombs to their designated targets: 44,000 kg hit Belgium and France, 36,000 kg England, and 80,000 kg Russia and south eastern Europe. However, questions remain over whether airships (and more importantly, their irreplaceable crews) would have been better used as a purely naval weapon.

Vizeadmiral Reinhard Scheer became Strasser's superior in January 1916, and tried unsuccessfully to tame Strasser's aggressive pursuit of independence. On 28 November, 1916, Strasser was appointed by imperial decree as "Leader of Airships" (Führer der Luftschiffe; F.d.L.).

== Death in the last raid over Great Britain ==
Strasser did not live to see the end of the war. On 5 August 1918, during a night raid against Boston, Norwich, and the Humber Estuary, Strasser's L 70 met a British reconnaissance D.H.4. Pilot Major Egbert Cadbury and Gunner Major Robert Leckie shot down the L 70 just north of Wells-next-the-Sea on the Norfolk coast. None of the 23 men aboard survived. It proved to be the last airship raid over Great Britain.

== Legacy ==
Strasser's impact on both the war and history was important for the future of air warfare. He was instrumental in the development of long range bombing and the development of the rigid airship as an efficient, high altitude, all-weather aircraft. He was a major proponent of the doctrine of bombing attacks on civilian as well as military targets, to serve both as propaganda and as a means of diverting resources from the front line.

We who strike the enemy where his heart beats have been slandered as 'baby killers' ... Nowadays, there is no such animal as a noncombatant. Modern warfare is total warfare.

— Peter Strasser

== Awards ==
- Iron Cross of 1914, 1st and 2nd class
- Pour le Mérite (20 August 1917)
- Hanseatic Cross of Hamburg
- Knight's Cross of the Royal House Order of Hohenzollern
- Order of the Red Eagle, 4th class
- Lifesaving Medal on Band

== See also ==
- Kaiserliche Marine
- Schütte-Lanz
- Total war
- Zeppelin
- List of Zeppelins
