= Bernard A. Smart =

Bernard Arthur Smart
- Born: Bernard Arthur Smart; 24 December 1891; Luton, United Kingdom
- Died: 11 May 1979 (aged 87); London, United Kingdom
- Military career
- Allegiance: British Empire (1914–1919)
- Branch: Royal Air Force
- Service years: 1914–1918; 1936–1944
- Rank: Air marshal
- Commands: HMS Yarmouth
- Conflicts: First World War
- Awards: DSO medal

Bernard Arthur Smart (24 December 1891 in Luton, north of London – May 1979 in Luton) was a British pilot during World War I, who performed some of the world's first attacks from early aircraft carriers, which were cruisers that had been rebuilt with catapults and a small flying deck.

== History ==
On 21 August 1917, he took off from HMS Yarmouth in a Sopwith Pup plane and shot down German airship Zeppelin LZ 66 (L 23) with 16 persons aboard over the North Sea, 40 km from Jutland's west coast beyond Stadil Fjord.

=== Downing of Airship L23 ===
I could see a man and an object unpleasantly like a machine-gun on top of the envelope, and I now realised the time had come. I was now at 7,000 feet and the Zeppelin a thousand feet below at an angle of 45 degrees and I was still heading straight for her stern. I pushed forward the control stick and dived. The speed indicator went with a rush up to 150 m.p.h. ... and rammed down the machine-gun’s operating lever - and held it there. The gun spat out and ... the Zeppelin was now a mass of flames and had dropped so that the nose was pointing to the sky at an angle of 45 degrees while the flames were fast licking up towards the nose ... An object was adrift from the forward end of the Zeppelin which I first took to be some part of the fabric falling off, but on looking again I discovered it to be a man descending in a parachute. He was the only one, and as he floated down, he and I seemed to be alone in space. I turned until my compass was in the opposite direction to that when I had been chasing the Zeppelin and then looked back to have a last glance at the blaze. The wreck had just reached the sea, only the very tip of it still being intact -- Bernard A. Smart

After destroying the airship Bernard A. Smart was actually unsure of where his support ships were located as he had been disoriented during the attack. Luckily the smoke from the airship attracted a British Navy squadron and he was able to ditch his plane in the water and was rescued by a British destroyer.

On 19 July 1918, he was sent from HMS Furious ca. 15 miles west of Lyngvig lighthouse as a pilot on a Sopwith Camel plane and led to the Tønder Bombing Raid of the airship base in Tønder, where the air ships L 54 and L 60 were burned in the big Toska hall.

Smart was honored 9 weeks after the shooting of L 23 with the Distinguished Service Order. He was honored again on 24 July 1918, on board HMS Furious in the presence of Admiral David Beatty, when to his great surprise, he was presented with an extra bar for his DSO by King George V.

== Home in Luton ==
Bernard Arthur Smart was the son of Charles Smart and wife Kate in Luton and worked in the parents' company in 1911, producing straw hats. At the age of 24 years on 24 July 1916, he qualified to become a pilot in the Royal Naval Air Service. After the war, in 1919, he retired as a pilot and became a businessman. In 1927, he became a cousin of Geoffrey Bowman Jenkins' company Bowman Models in Dereham, Norfolk, producing toys such as steam engines, boats, and locomotives.

Smart died in 1979 in Luton and in 2011 some of his possessions were sold, including his DSO medal, which went under the hammer for £63,000 (£ 93,200 in 2025).

The official death record indicates that Smart died in Norfolk, reading: Bernard Arthur Smart at East Dereham - June quarter (10 1008) - Born Dec 24th 1891

== Bibliography ==
Notes

References

- Bruce, J.M. (1 January 1954). "The Sopwith Pup". Flight International. ISSN 0015-3710.
- Dix Noonan Webb (7 March 2007). "Lot 937 7th March 2007". Dix Noonan Webb.
- Guttman, Jon & Illustrated by Simon Smith, Harry Dempsey, Richard Chasemore, Peter Bull (2012). Sopwith Camel: Air Vanguard. Bloomsbury Publishing. ISBN 9781780961774. - Total pages: 64
