= HMS Redoubt =

Four ships of the Royal Navy have been named HMS Redoubt, for the redoubt, a type of enclosed fort:

- HMS Redoubt (1793) was a 20-gun floating battery, formerly the civilian Rover. She was purchased in 1793 and sold in 1802.
- HMS Redoubt (1916) was an R-class destroyer launched in 1916 and sold in 1926.
- HMS Redoubt (H41) was an R-class destroyer launched in 1942 and transferred to the Indian Navy in 1949 as Ranjit.
- HMS Redoubt (L4001) was a Mark 8 Landing Craft Tank launched in 1945 as LCT 4001, named Redoubt in 1956 and sold in 1966 as the ferry Dimitris.
