= Zeppelin LZ 112 =

An X-class Zeppelin of the Imperial German Navy.

LZ 112 (L 70)
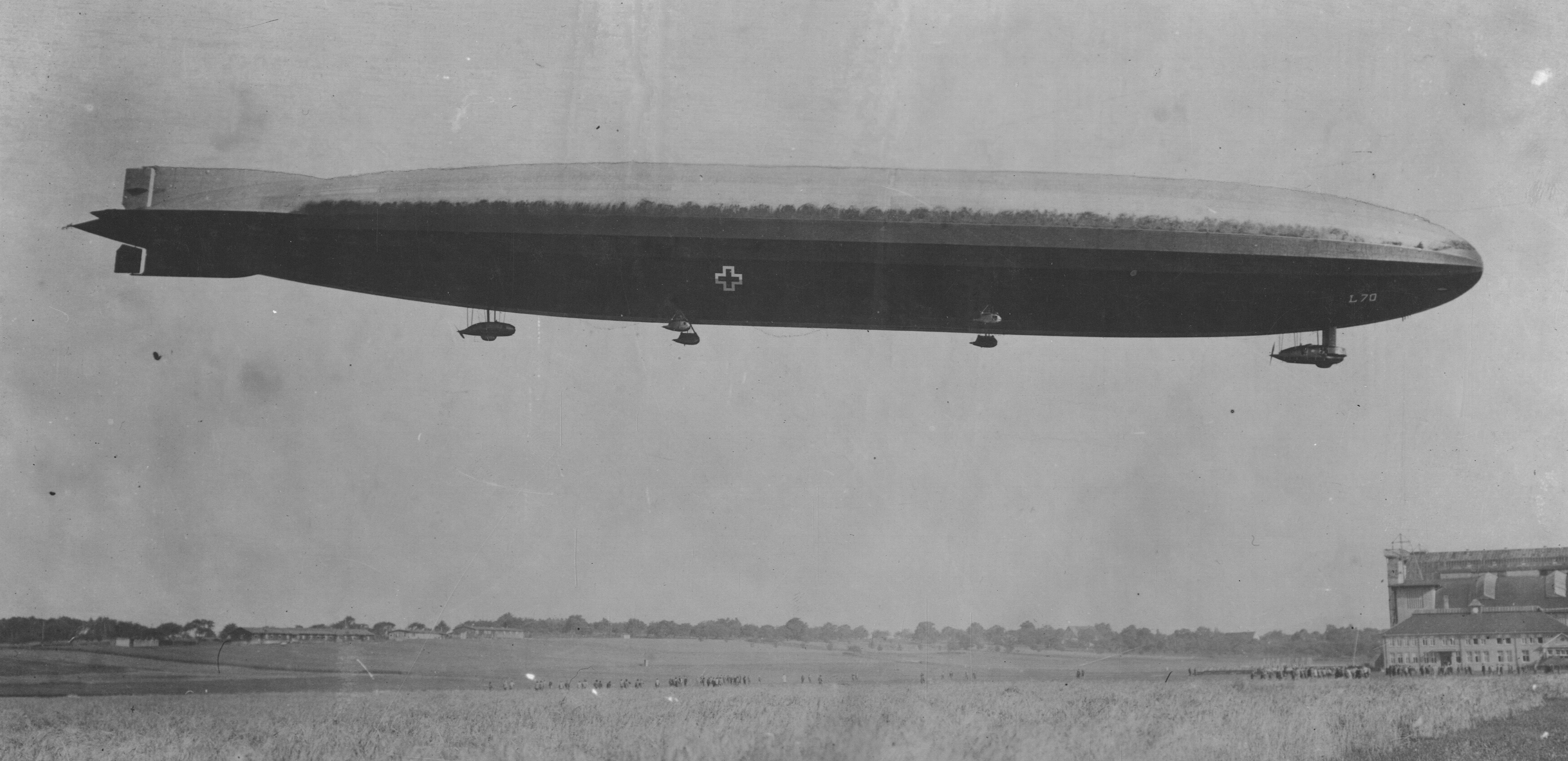
- Zeppelin LZ 112 (L 70)

General information
- Type: X-class reconnaissance-bomber rigid airship
- National origin: German Empire
- Manufacturer: Luftschiffbau Zeppelin
- Designer: Ludwig Dürr
- Primary user: Imperial German Navy

History
- First flight: 1 July 1918
- Retired: 6 August 1918 - Intercepted and destroyed over North Sea by British de Havilland DH-4 flown by Major Egbert Cadbury with Captain Robert Leckie

The Imperial German Navy Zeppelin LZ 112, given the tactical number L 70, was an X-class / L70-class World War I Zeppelin of the Imperial German Navy.

== History ==
LZ 112 was the first of three Zeppelins of the X-class built for the Imperial German Navy. The third and last of the X-class, Dixmude made its first flight on 9 July 1920 and was surrendered to the French authorities four days later.

== Final bombing raid ==
Peter Strasser

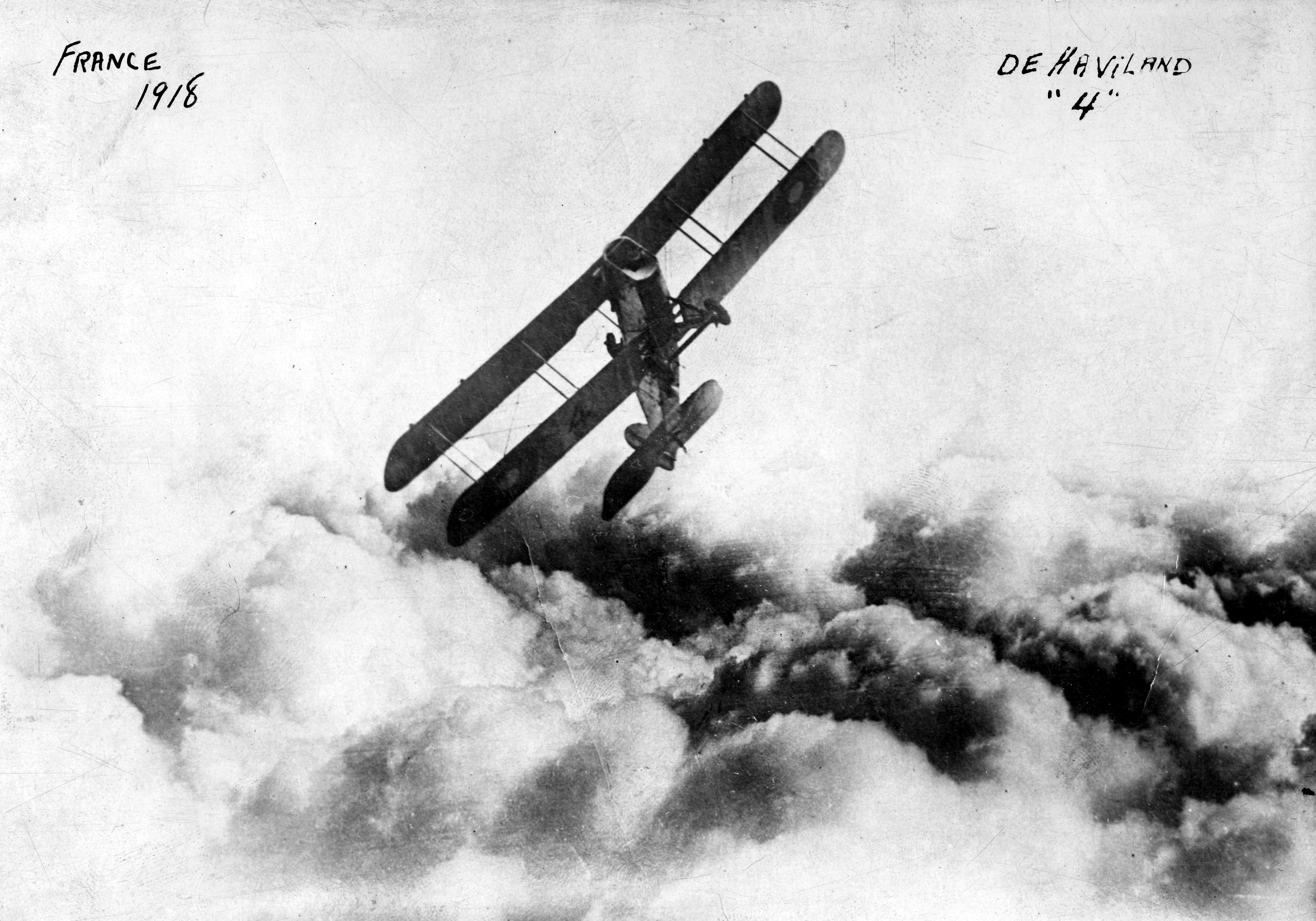
Airco DH.4 like this shot down LZ 112

On 28 November 1916 a new commander of the Zeppelin force was appointed by imperial decree Peter Strasser "Leader of Airships" (Führer der Luftschiffe; F.d.L.). He was instrumental in the development of long-range bombing and the development of the rigid airship as an efficient, high altitude, all-weather aircraft. He was a major proponent of the doctrine of bombing attacks on civilian as well as military targets, to serve both as propaganda and as a means of diverting resources from the front line.

We who strike the enemy where his heart beats have been slandered as 'baby killers' ... Nowadays, there is no such animal as a noncombatant. Modern warfare is total warfare.

— Peter Strasser

As such late in the war Strasser planned a five Zeppelin raid on the United Kingdom. The raid would be dynamic with the exact target changing depending on the weather. His orders were to attack south or middle England hoping to even reach London. On the afternoon of 5 August 1918, LZ 112 took off from Friedrichshafen with four other airships. They headed for the east coast of England, timing their flight to arrive off the coast just after dark. The commander of LZ 112 was Fregattenkapitän Strasser, the Führer der Luftschiffe ("Leader of Airships", the commander of all Naval airships). However, the airship squadron was spotted out at sea by the Leman Tail lightship, which signalled their course and position to the Admiralty.

British RAF Major Egbert Cadbury was attending a charity concert at which his wife was performing when an RAF orderly found him. Cadbury drove back to the airfield, where he was informed that three Zeppelins had been reported about 50 miles (80 km) to the north-east, and knowing there was only one aircraft available, an Airco DH.4, he grabbed his flying kit and ran for it, beating a rival pilot to the cockpit by a split-second. With Captain Robert Leckie in the rear gunner's seat, Cadbury climbed up to over 16,000 feet (4,900 m) by jettisoning his reserve fuel and some small bombs, where he saw three Zeppelins ahead and above him. He later recounted:

At 22.20 we had climbed to 16,400 feet and I attacked the Zeppelin ahead slightly to the port so as to clear any obstruction that might be suspended from the airship. It was a most fascinating sight – awe inspiring – to see this enormous Zeppelin blotting the whole sky above one. The tracers ignited the escaping gas, the flames spreading rapidly and turning the airship into a fireball in less than a minute. The LZ 112 dived headlong into the clouds. It was one of the most terrifying sights I have ever seen to see this huge machine hurtling down with all those crew on board.

Cadbury and Leckie, and another pilot Lieutenant Ralph Edmund Keys, then attacked and damaged another Zeppelin, which promptly turned tail and headed for home. All three received the Distinguished Flying Cross.

These airmen, Cadbury and Leckie, had already shot down two Zeppelins: prior to LZ 112, Cadbury had downed L 21 and Leckie, L 22.

== Specifications ==
Data from Zeppelin : rigid airships, 1893-1940,

General characteristics

- Crew: 30
- Capacity: 47,500 kg (104,720 lb) typical disposable load
- Length: 211.1 m (692 ft 7 in)
- Diameter: 23.9 m (78 ft 5 in)
- Fineness ratio: 8.83
- Volume: 62,200 m^{3} (2,200,000 cu ft) in 15 gas cells

(sometimes quoted as 62,600 m^{3} (2,210,698 cu ft))

- Empty weight: 24,700 kg (54,454 lb)
- Fuel capacity: 12,000 kg (26,455 lb) maximum
- Useful lift: 72,200 kg (159,200 lb)
- Powerplant: 6 × Maybach Mb IVa 6-cylinder water-cooled piston engine, 175 kW (235 hp) each

(originally seven)

- Propellers: 2-bladed fixed-pitch propellers

Performance

- Maximum speed: 131.4 km/h (81.6 mph, 71.0 kn)
- Cruise speed: 109.8 km/h (68.2 mph, 59.3 kn)
- Range: 12,000 km (7,500 mi, 6,500 nmi) at cruising speed
- Service ceiling: 6,200 m (20,300 ft) static

== See also ==
- List of Zeppelins
