= HMS Redoubt (1916) =

Destroyer of the Royal Navy

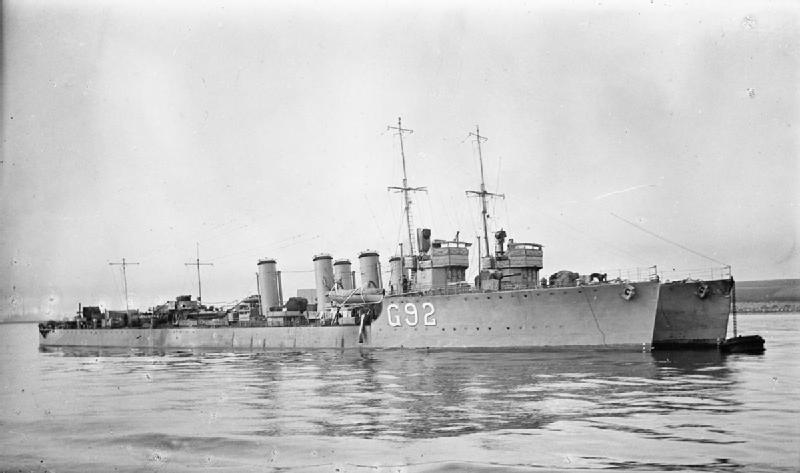
- Two R-class destroyers, sister ship HMS Rob Roy nearest

History

United Kingdom
- Name: Redoubt
- Builder: Doxford, Sunderland
- Launched: 28 October 1916
- Decommissioned: 13 July 1926
- Fate: Sold for scrap, 13 July 1926

General characteristics
- Class & type: R-class destroyer
- Displacement: 975 long tons (991 t) (normal); 1,173 long tons (1,192 t) (deep load)
- Length: 276 ft (84.1 m) (o.a.)
- Beam: 26 ft 8 in (8.13 m)
- Draught: 9 ft (2.7 m)
- Installed power: 3 Yarrow boilers; 27,000 shp (20,000 kW)
- Propulsion: 2 geared Parsons steam turbines
- Speed: 36 knots (66.7 km/h; 41.4 mph)
- Range: 3,450 nmi (6,390 km; 3,970 mi) at 15 knots (28 km/h; 17 mph)
- Complement: 82
- Armament: 3 × QF 4 in (102 mm) Mark IV guns; 1 × single 2-pdr (40 mm) "pom-pom" Mk. II anti-aircraft gun; 4 × 21 in (533 mm) torpedo tubes (2×2)

HMS Redoubt was an R-class destroyer which served with the Royal Navy during World War I. The R class was an improvement of the preceding M-class, primarily through having geared steam turbines which offered greater efficiency and range. Launched on 28 October 1916, the ship joined the Harwich Force, operating as part of a destroyer flotilla undertaking convoy escort and anti-submarine operations in the North Sea. During 1918, Redoubt took part in an experiment to launch fighter aircraft from a lighter towed beyond a destroyer. The first flight took place on 1 August and the first successful operation ten days later when the Sopwith Camel flew by Lieutenant S.D. Culley took off and destroyed the German airship LZ 100. After the war, the vessel was transferred to the Home Fleet but was sold on 13 July 1926 to be broken up, part of a large scale disposal of older destroyers by the Navy.

== Design and development ==
Redoubt was one of seventeen R-class destroyers delivered to the British Admiralty as part of the Sixth War Construction Programme. The design was generally similar to the preceding M-class destroyers, but differed in having geared turbines, the central gun mounted on a bandstand and minor changes to improve seakeeping. The destroyer had an overall length of 276 feet (84.12 m), with a beam of 26 feet 8 inches (8.13 m) and a draught of 9 feet (2.74 m). Displacement was 975 long tons (991 t) normal and 1,173 long tons (1,192 t) deep load. Power was provided by three Yarrow boilers feeding two Parsons geared steam turbines rated at 27,000 shaft horsepower (20,000 kW) and driving two shafts, to give a design speed of 36 knots (67 km/h; 41 mph). Three funnels were fitted. A total of 296 long tons (301 t) of fuel oil was carried, giving a design range of 3,450 nautical miles (6,390 km; 3,970 mi) at 15 knots (28 km/h; 17 mph) due to the enhanced efficiency of the geared machinery. The ship had a complement of 82 officers and ratings.

Armament consisted of three 4-inch (102 mm) Mk IV QF guns on the ship's centreline, with one on the forecastle, one aft on a raised platform and one between the second and third funnels. A single 2-pounder (40 mm) pom-pom anti-aircraft gun was carried on a platform between two rotating twin mounts for 21 in (533 mm) torpedoes.

== Construction and career ==
Redoubt was laid down by William Doxford & Sons at Sunderland on the River Wear and launched on 28 October 1916, entering service during March the following year. The ship was the second to serve in the Royal Navy with the name.

On commissioning, Redoubt joined the Tenth Destroyer Flotilla of the Harwich Force. The flotilla was involved in supporting the convoys that crossed the North Sea. During one foggy night, 18 May 1917, the ship was part of a division led by the destroyer Stork when the convoy they were following disappeared into the fog. Suddenly, Stork saw the German submarine U-64 submerging and the two destroyers raced to the scene, dropping four depth charges after the fleeing boat. The submarine stayed silent at a depth of 40 metres (130 ft) until the destroyers left, and then went away unharmed. On 1 June, the vessel formed part of a covering force led by the cruiser Undaunted that protected the monitors Erebus and Terror when they bombarded Ostend.

The German Air Force had put a number of Zeppelin airships into service in a maritime patrol function and these were proving immune to the limited anti-aircraft weaponry mounted by the Harwich Force. It was therefore decided to trial launching a fighter aircraft from a lighter towed behind a destroyer. Redoubt was allocated to the trial and, on 1 August 1918, a Canadian pilot, Lieutenant S.D. Culley, successfully took off in a Sopwith Camel from a lighter, named H5, towed behind the destroyer. The trial was swiftly followed by the first operation. After an abort on 5 August due to poor weather, the first operation started five days later. On 11 August Redoubt, towing H5, was sailing as part of the Harwich Force on a sweep of Heligoland Bight when Zeppelin LZ 100 was spotted. Culley took off and shot the airship down. When he returned, the pilot stood on the destroyer's aft gun platform as Redoubt stood and the entire Force passed by in salute.

After the Armistice, Redoubt initially remained with the Harwich Force. When the Force was dissolved, the destroyer was allocated to the Home Fleet, serving under the dreadnought battleship King George V. However, in 1923, the Navy decided to scrap many of the older destroyers in preparation for the introduction of newer and larger vessels. Redoubt was one of the destroyers chosen for retirement. On 13 July 1926, the destroyer was sold to J. Brown and broken up.

== Pennant numbers ==
Pennant number	Date
F56	1917
F57	1918
