= RAF Narborough =

Former RAF station in Norfolk, England

- Swaffham, Norfolk in England

Site information
- Owner: Air Ministry
- Operator: Royal Naval Air Service; Royal Flying Corps; Royal Air Force

Location
- Location within Norfolk
- Coordinates: 52°39′26″N 0°35′42″E

Site history
- Built: 1915
- In use: 1915-1919
- Battles/wars: First World War

Airfield information
Runways
Direction	Length and surface
00/00	Grass field

RAF Narborough was a military aerodrome in Norfolk operated in the First World War. It opened on 28 May 1915, originally as a Royal Naval Air Station for RNAS Great Yarmouth tasked with defending against Zeppelin raids. The airfield covered a 908-acre (3.67 km^{2}) site, including 30 acres (120,000 m^{2}) of buildings – making it the largest First World War airfield in Britain. These buildings included seven large hangars, seven sheds, five workshops, two coal yards, two Sergeant's Messes, three Dope sheds and a Guardroom.

== Unit history ==
The airfield was transferred to the Royal Flying Corps in 1916, with the arrival of No. 35 Squadron of 7 Wing from Thetford (Snarehill), operating Vickers F.B.5, Royal Aircraft Factory B.E.2c and BE2e and Armstrong Whitworth FK3 aircraft. Initially the squadron trained as a Corps Reconnaissance unit, until moving to France on 25 January 1917 equipped with the Armstrong Whitworth FK8.

No. 59 Squadron was formed at Narborough on 1 August 1916, also as a Corps Reconnaissance unit, operating RE8s and possibly DH2s. This squadron moved to France on 13 February 1917.

Several other units operated from this airfield, including No. 48 Reserve, No. 50 Reserve, No. 53 Reserve Squadrons and No. 1 Training Squadron, who operated the Sopwith Camel from Narborough between 1 October 1917 and 10 October 1917. No. 83 Squadron of 7 Wing arrived from Wyton in December 1917 for training in the night bomber role. On 1 January 1918, No. 121 Squadron was formed here with Airco DH9 light bombers.

== Armistice celebration ==
On 11 November 1918, aircraft from nearby RAF Marham bombed Narborough with flour bags to celebrate the Armistice. RAF Narborough retaliated against Marham, sending its planes to bomb them with bags of soot.

== Closure ==
No. 56, 60 and 64 Squadrons of 38 Wing arrived in February 1919, from the Western Front, but brought no aircraft. No. 64 Squadron disbanded on 31 December 1919, while No. 56 and 60 Squadrons left for RAF Bircham Newton, with the station closing down and being returned to agriculture. Almost nothing remains of this airfield today, with the last hangar being demolished in mid 1977, having been damaged by gales.

== RAF units and aircraft ==
Unit	Dates	Aircraft	Variant	Notes
No. 35 Squadron RFC	1916–1917	Royal Aircraft Factory F.E.2b; Armstrong Whitworth F.K.8; Vickers F.B.5		
No. 56 Squadron RAF	1919	Royal Aircraft Factory S.E.5a		A cadre only returned from France
No. 59 Squadron RFC	1916–1917	Various aircraft		Formed from 35 Sqn then to France with the R.E.8
No. 60 Squadron RAF	1919–1920	Royal Aircraft Factory S.E.5a		A cadre only returned from France
No. 64 Squadron RAF	1919	Royal Aircraft Factory S.E.5a		A cadre only returned from France
No. 83 Squadron RFC/RAF	1917–1918	Royal Aircraft Factory F.E.2b		To France March 1918
No. 121 Squadron RFC/RAF	1918	Various aircraft		Training in preparation for the D.H.9, but moved to Filton and was disbanded.

== See also ==
- List of former Royal Air Force stations
- List of Royal Air Force aircraft squadrons
