= Zeppelin LZ 100 =

LZ 100 (L 53)
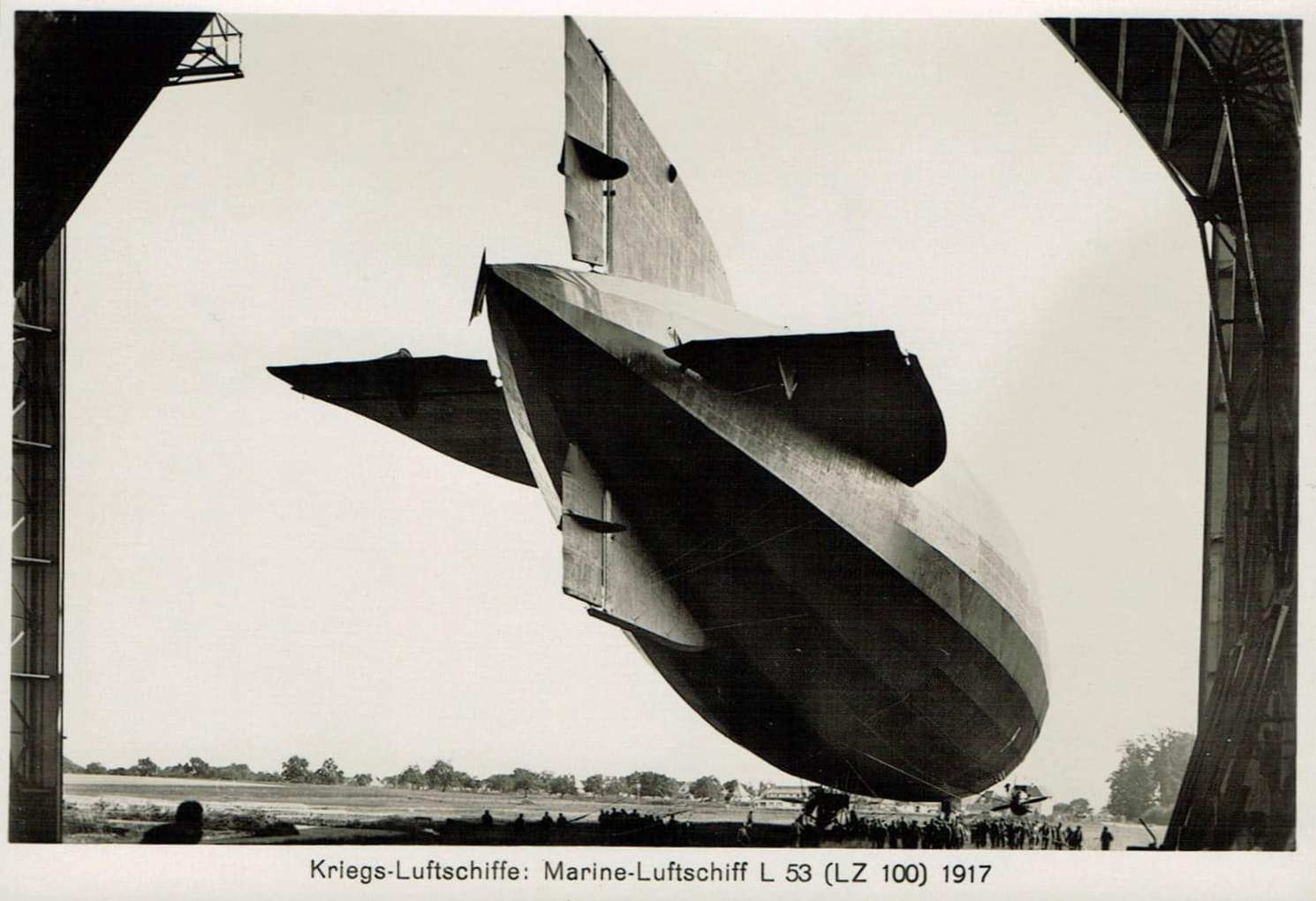
- Zeppelin LZ 100 (L 53)

General information
- Type: V-class reconnaissance-bomber rigid airship
- National origin: German Empire
- Manufacturer: Luftschiffbau Zeppelin
- Designer: Ludwig Dürr
- Primary user: Imperial German Navy

History
- First flight: 8 August 1917
- Retired: 11 August 1918 - Flight Sub-Lt Stuart D Culley takes off in a Sopwith Camel 2F1 bi-plane (pictured) from a barge towed by destroyer HMS Redoubt

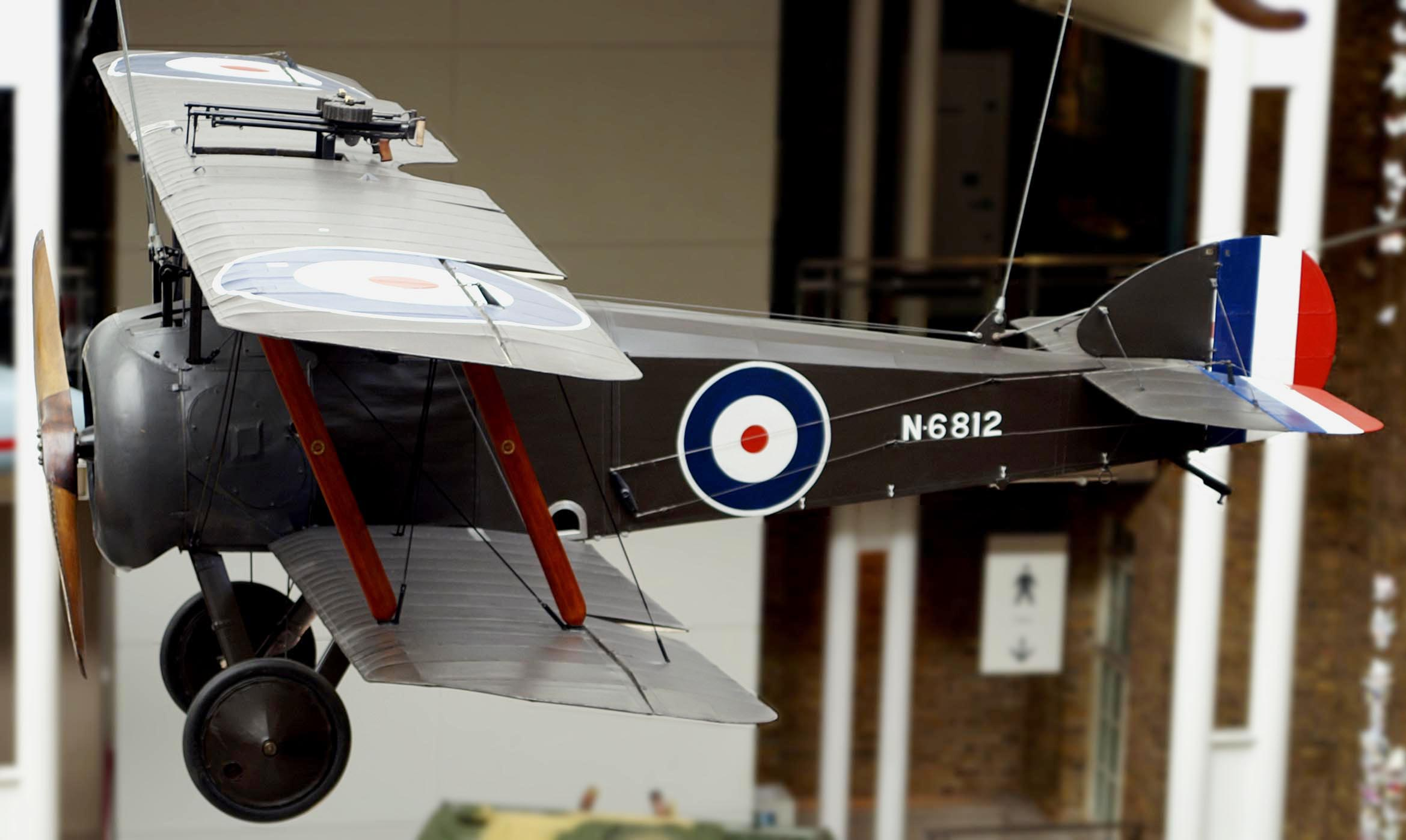
The Sopwith Camel 2F1 (s/n N6812) flown by Flight Sub-Lieutenant Stuart D Culley

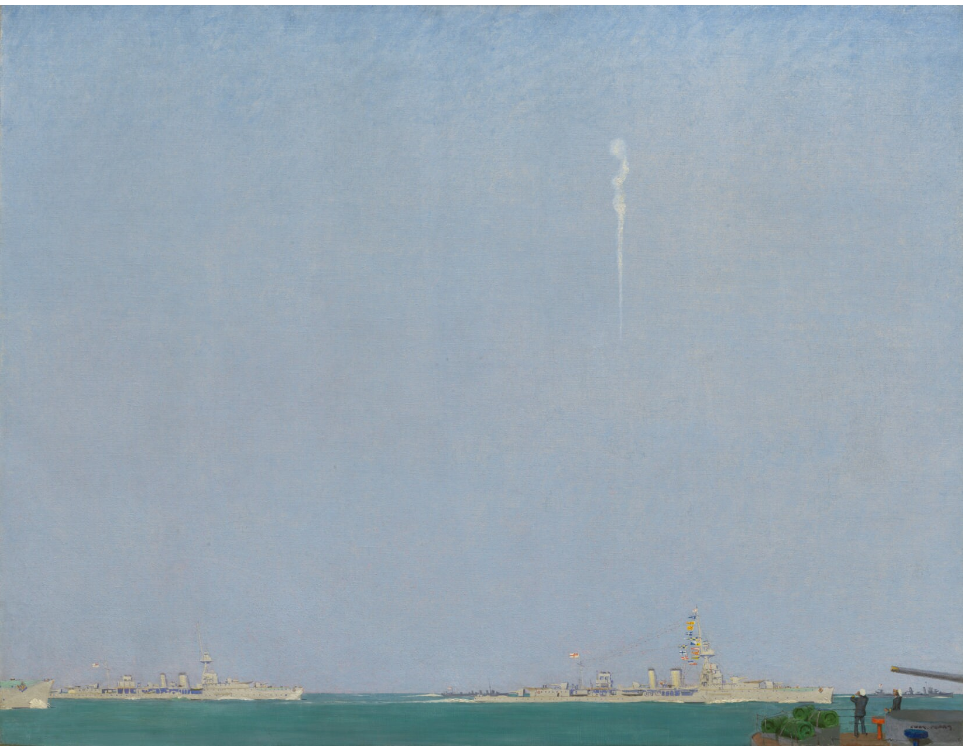
Charles Pears painting of Zeppelin LZ 100 (L 53) crashing to the North Sea

The Imperial German Navy Zeppelin LZ 100, given the tactical number L 53, was an V-class World War I zeppelin of the Imperial German Navy. It was shot down by the British RAF and was the last Airship of the First World War.

== Airship history ==
First launched on 8 August 1917, Zeppelin LZ 100 (L 53) took part in 19 reconnaissance missions; 4 attacks on England, dropping 11,930 kg (26,300 lb) of bombs.

== Stuart D Culley ==
Flight Sub-Lieutenant Stuart D Culley was born in Nebraska in 1895 of a Canadian mother and an English father. He joined the Canadian military in Ottawa, Canada and was posted as a pilot in the RNAS. In April of 1918 all British flying forces were combined into the RAF.

HMS Redoubt was allocated to the trial and, on 1 August 1918, a Canadian pilot, Lieutenant S.D. Culley, successfully took off in a Sopwith Camel from a lighter, named H5, towed behind the destroyer. The trial was swiftly followed by the first operation. After an abort on 5 August due to poor weather, the first operation started five days later. On 11 August Redoubt, towing H5, was sailing as part of the Harwich Force on a sweep of Heligoland Bight when Zeppelin LZ 100 was spotted. Culley took off and shot the airship down. When he returned, the pilot stood on the destroyer's aft gun platform as Redoubt stood and the entire Force passed by in salute.

Ascended to a height of 19,000 feet, at which altitude he attacked an enemy airship, and brought it down in flames completely destroyed. This was a most difficult undertaking involving great personal risk, and the highest praise is due to Lieutenant Culley for the gallantry and skill he displayed.

He was appointed to a permanent commission in the RAF, 1 August 1919 in rank of Flying Officer. On 1 January 1924, was again promoted Flight Lieutenant. To RAF Depot on transfer to Home Establishment, 10 January 1924. Records show that in 14 March 1933, S/L S.D. Culley, DSO, was posted to command No.39 (Bomber) Squadron, Risalpur.

== See also ==
- List of Zeppelins

== Bibliography ==
Notes

References

- Smith, Malcolm (2014). Voices in Flight: The Royal Naval Air Service During the Great War. Barnsley: Pen and Sword. ISBN 978-1-78346-383-1.
- Taylor, Michael John Haddrick, ed. (1980). Jane's Encyclopedia of Aviation. Vol. 1. London: Jane's. ISBN 978-0-71060-710-2.
