= Zeppelin LZ 64 =

Imperial German Navy Zeppelin

LZ 64 (L 22)
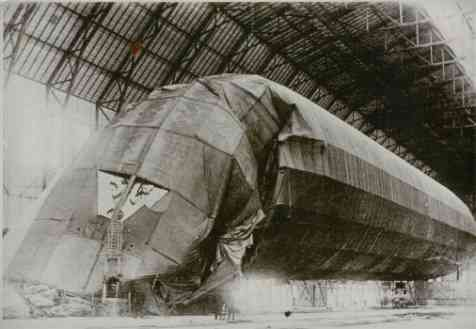
- Zeppelin LZ 64 (L 22) damaged in Toska

General information
- Type: X-class reconnaissance-bomber rigid airship
- National origin: German Empire
- Manufacturer: Luftschiffbau Zeppelin
- Designer: Ludwig Dürr
- Primary user: Imperial German Navy
- Number built: 1

History
- First flight: 3 March 1916
- Retired: Destroyed by RNAS Curtis H12 flying boat flown by Flight Commander Robert Leckie (later Air Vice Marshal) near Terschelling on 14 May 1917 during a reconnaissance mission.

The Imperial German Navy Zeppelin LZ 64, given the tactical number L 22, was a Q-class / L20-class World War I zeppelin of the Imperial German Navy.

== Operational history ==
LZ 64 carried out thirty reconnaissance missions, including 8 attacks on Britain, dropping 9,215 kg (20,316 lb) of bombs.

== Last mission ==
Lieutenant Robert Leckie (a Canadian) of the Royal Naval Air Service (RNAS), was sent on a mission on 14 May 1917, as pilot of Curtiss Model H-12 Large America 8666, under the command of Flight Lieutenant Christopher John Galpin. The aircraft left Great Yarmouth on patrol at 03.30 a.m. in poor weather, with heavy rain and low cloud. The weather cleared as they approached Texel, and at 4:45 a.m. they spotted Brandaris, (the lighthouse on Terschelling), and a few minutes later LZ 64 about 10–15 mi (9–13 nmi; 16–24 km) away. The Curtiss increased speed and gained height, with Leckie at the controls as Galpin manned the twin Lewis guns mounted in the bow.

The Curtiss managed to approach to within 0.5 mi (0.4 nmi; 0.8 km) before she was spotted, and the Zeppelin attempted to evade, but by then it was too late. The aircraft dived down alongside and Galpin fired an entire drum of incendiary bullets at a range of about 50 yd (46 m). Zeppelin L 64 rapidly caught fire, and crashed into the sea. The Curtiss returned to Great Yarmouth by 7:50 a.m., and they found only two bullet holes, in the left upper wing and the hull amidships, where the Germans had returned fire. Leckie was also credited in the downing of LZ 112.

All 21 crew members were killed in action 40 nautical miles northwest of Terschelling, among them commandant Kapitänleutnant Ulrich Lehmann (b. 11 March 1889 in Köslin) and Leutnant zur See Hans-Ewald Heinrich Otto August von Knobelsdorff (b. 1 September 1892 in Oldenburg), a younger brother of Otto von Knobelsdorff.

== Specifications (LZ 64) ==
Data from Zeppelin : rigid airships, 1893-1940

General characteristics

- Crew: 16 (+)
- Capacity: 17,900 kg (39,463 lb) typical disposable load
- Length: 178.5 m (585 ft 8 in)
- Diameter: 18.5 m (60 ft 8 in) maximum
- Fineness ratio: 9.55
- Volume: 35,800 m^{3} (1,260,000 cu ft) in 18 gas cells
- Empty weight: 23,650 kg (52,139 lb)
- Useful lift: 41,550 kg (91,600 lb)
- Powerplant: 4 × Maybach HS-Lu engines 6-cylinder water-cooled in-line piston engines, 180 kW (240 hp) each
- Propellers: 2-bladed fixed-pitch propellers

Performance

- Maximum speed: 95.4 km/h (59.3 mph, 51.5 kn)
- Range: 4,300 km (2,700 mi, 2,300 nmi) maximum

== See also ==
- List of Zeppelins
- LZ-22 forced to land on 21 August 1914
