= HMS Yarmouth =

Six ships of the Royal Navy have borne the name HMS Yarmouth after the Norfolk town and port of Great Yarmouth:

- English ship Yarmouth (1653) was a 50-gun ship launched in 1653 and broken up in 1680.
- HMS Yarmouth (1695) was a 70-gun third rate launched in 1695. She was rebuilt in 1709, converted to a hulk in 1740 and sold in 1769.
- HMS Yarmouth (1745) was a 64-gun third rate launched in 1745. She fought at Cuddalore, Negapatam and Pondicherry and later saw action in the American War of Independence. She was refitted as a 60-gun ship in 1781, used as a receiving ship from 1783 and was broken up in 1811.
- HMS Yarmouth (1798) was a lighter launched in 1798. She was rebuilt in 1810, transferred to the coastguard in 1828 and sold in 1835.
- HMS Yarmouth (1911) was a Town-class light cruiser launched in 1911 and sold in 1929.
- HMS Yarmouth (F101) was a Rothesay-class frigate launched in 1959 and expended as a target in 1987.

== Battle honours ==
Ships named Yarmouth have earned the following battle honours:

- Lowestoft 1665
- Four Days' Battle 1666
- Orfordness 1666
- Sole Bay 1672
- Schooneveld 1673
- Texel 1673
- Gibraltar 1704
- Velez Malaga 1704
- Marbella 1705
- Finisterre 1747
- Ushant 1747
- Sadras 1758
- Negapatam 1758
- Porot Novo 1759
- The Saints 1782
- Jutland 1916
- Falklands 1982
