= Tondern raid =

1918 British bombing raid in Tønder, Denmark

Tondern Raid
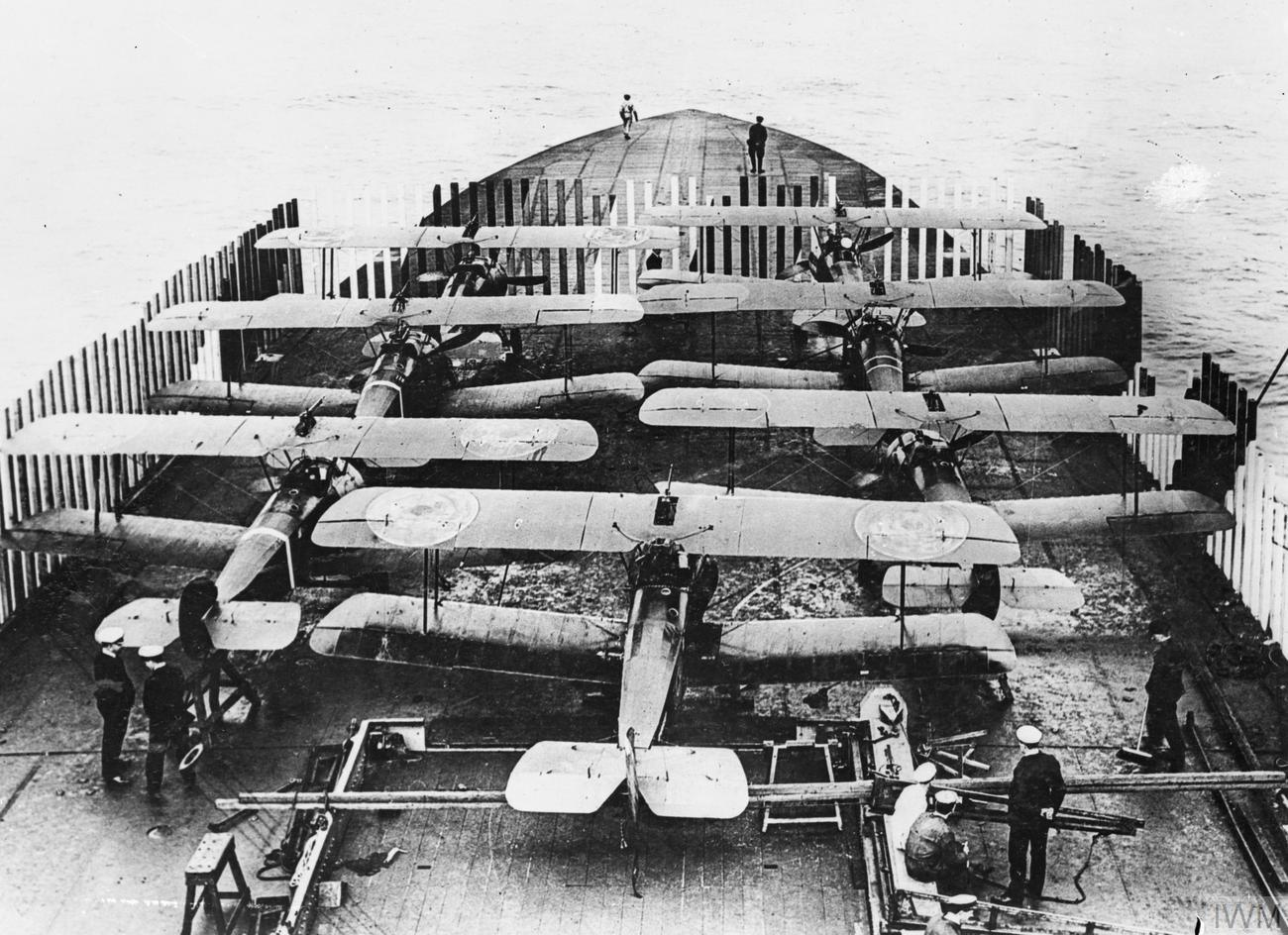
- The seven Sopwith Camels on the flight deck of HMS Furious en route to the Tondern raid
Date	19 July 1918
Location	Tondern, German Empire; now Tønder, Denmark; 54°56′N 8°51′E
Result	British victory

Belligerents
United Kingdom	German Empire

Commanders and leaders
(United Kingdom) Richard Phillimore	None

Strength
7 aircraft	2 airships; 1 captive balloon

Casualties and losses
1 pilot drowned; 3 interned; 1 aircraft damaged; 2 aircraft abandoned; 1 aircraft lost at sea	4 wounded; 2 airships destroyed; 1 captive balloon destroyed; 2 hangars damaged
- Location of Tondern (now Tønder, Denmark)

The Tondern raid or Operation F.7, was a British bombing raid by the Royal Navy and Royal Air Force against the Imperial German Navy airship base at Tønder, Denmark, then part of Germany. The airships were used for the strategic bombing of Britain. On 19 July 1918, seven Sopwith Camels took off from HMS Furious, a converted battlecruiser, in the first attack in history by aircraft from an aircraft carrier. For the loss of one man and several aircraft, the British destroyed Zeppelins L 54, L 60 and a captive balloon.

== Background ==
=== Naval aviation ===
Britain, Japan and Russia had conducted ship-based air raids since 1914 but these were by seaplanes lowered into the water by cranes. Furious was designed for aircraft to take off from its forward flight deck.

=== HMS Furious ===
In March 1918 the battlecruiser HMS Furious joined the Grand Fleet at Scapa Flow, flying the flag of the Rear Admiral Commanding Aircraft (RAA), Richard Phillimore. Furious had been converted for use as an aircraft carrier during her construction, with a flight deck forward of her main superstructure. During 1917 the carrier had been equipped with Sopwith Camel 2F.1a, naval variant of the Sopwith Camel. These partially replaced the Sopwith 1½ Strutter. In late 1917 a second flight deck was fitted aft, upon which landing proved to be "almost as hazardous as ditching in the sea". Until such need arose she was dispatched on reconnaissance missions off the Heligoland Bight, searching for minefields and looking for evidence of counter-mining by the Germans.

=== Plan ===
An attack on the bases of the Naval Airship Division of the Imperial German Navy (Kaiserliche Marine) was suggested to Rear Admiral Phillimore by his Royal Air Force staff officer Lieutenant-Colonel Robert Clark-Hall and one of his pilots, Squadron Commander Richard Bell-Davies, VC. Clark-Hall received Phillimore's approval and that of the Commander-in-Chief of the Grand Fleet, Admiral David Beatty. (Note: On 1 April 1918 the Royal Naval Air Service was amalgamated with the Royal Flying Corps to form the Royal Air Force. RNAS officers who had been part of the Navy hierarchy became members of the RAF.) It was originally planned to use Sopwith 1½ Strutters in an attack but these were too valuable for reconnaissance and Sopwith Camels were substituted, whose range meant an attack on the airship base at Tønder.

== Prelude ==
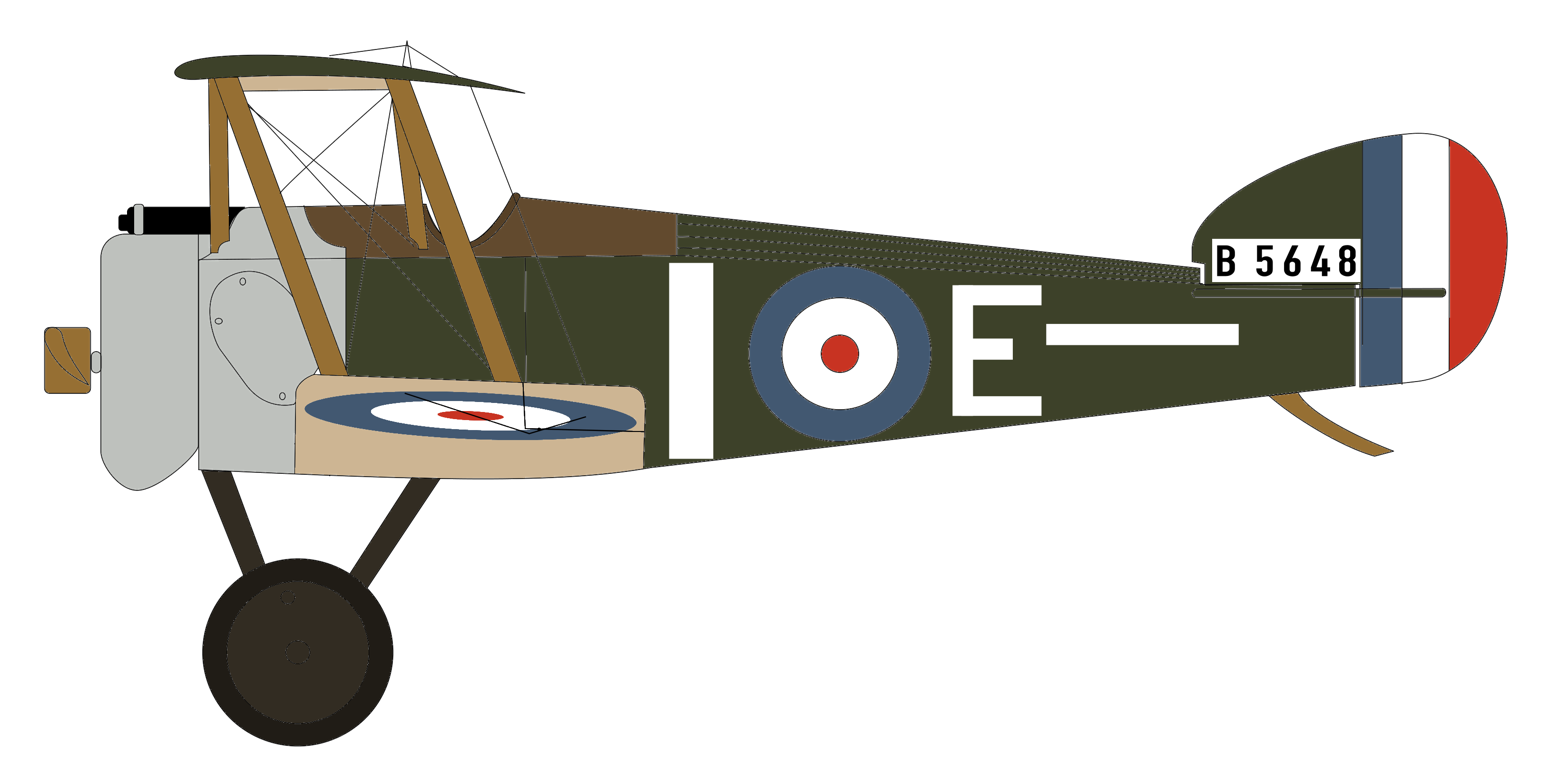
Example of a Sopwith Camel F.1, similar to those on the raid

Operation F.6 was a plan for two waves of four aircraft, each pilot receiving special training. Major Moore was posted away before the scheduled date of 29 June 1918, by which time it was too late to train a replacement. Training consisted of bombing runs on the airfield at Turnhouse, where the outlines of Tondern's three airship sheds were marked. The pilots were Captains W. D. Jackson, William Dickson, Bernard Smart and T. K. Thyne and Lieutenants N. E. Williams, S. Dawson and W. A. Yeulett. On 27 June Furious sailed from Rosyth, escorted by the 1st Light Cruiser Squadron and eight destroyers from the 13th Destroyer Flotilla. On 29 June the ships reached the flying off point but with Force 6 [22–27 kn (41–50 km/h; 25–31 mph)] winds blowing, flying was deemed impossible and the operation was called off.

== Operation F.7 ==
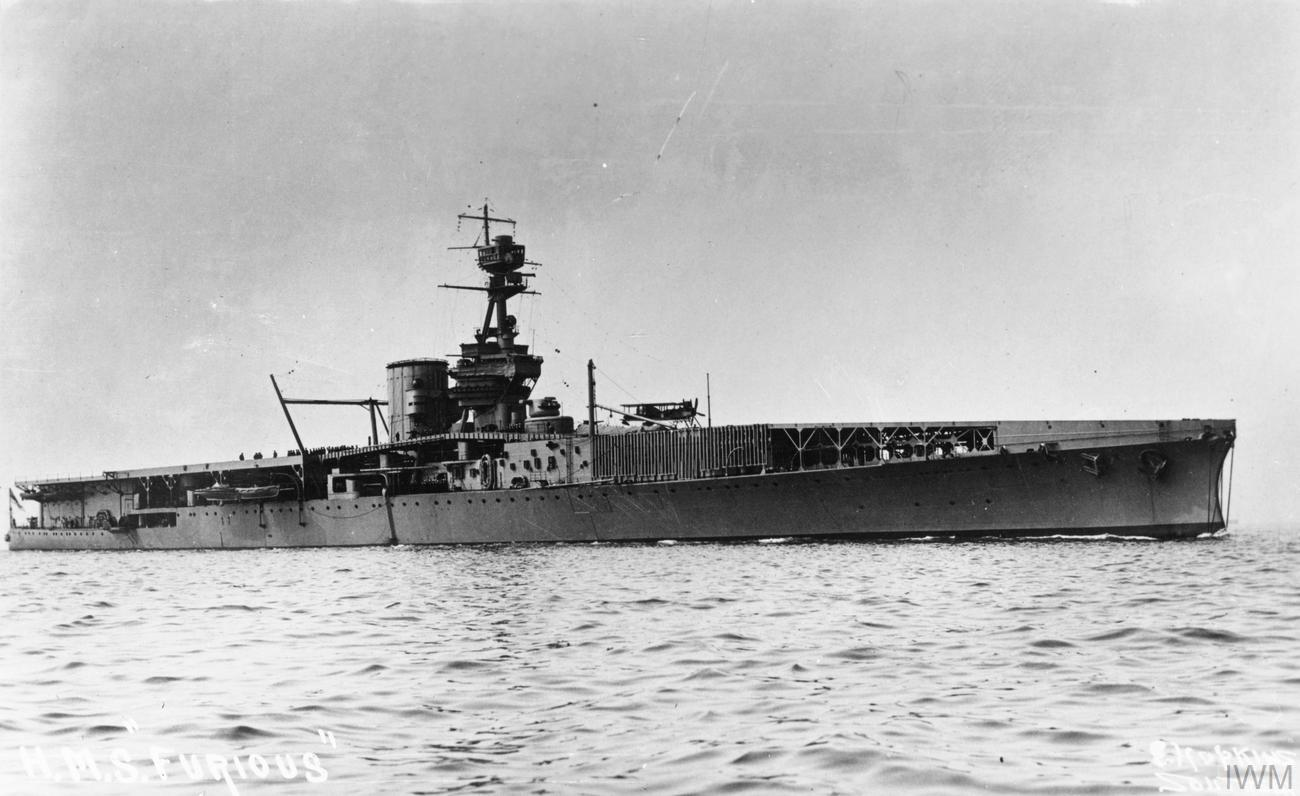
HMS Furious with its forward flying-off deck and aft landing deck

Another attempt, Operation F.7 began when Furious sailed at 12:03 on 17 July. This time she was escorted by Force B, including a division of the 1st Battle Squadron (all the new Revenge-class battleships), the 7th Light Cruiser Squadron and a destroyer screen. HMS Resolution's "Y" turret guns had been loaded with a special shrapnel shell for use against airships. During the passage the destroyer HMS Valentine investigated a reported submarine contact but nothing came of it.

At 03:04 in the morning of 18 July Furious was ready to fly off her Camels when a thunderstorm struck. Rather than cancel the operation, it was decided to delay it twenty-four hours and Furious and her destroyer screen fell back on Force B. The combined squadron cruised out of sight off the Danish coast until the morning of 19 July and in worsening weather conditions Furious flew off her Camels between 03:13 and 03:21. The first flight consisted of Jackson, Dickson and Williams; the second of Smart, Dawson, Yeulett and Thyne. Thyne was forced to turn around with engine trouble before reaching the target and ditched his aircraft before being recovered. (Note: Despite Furious having a landing deck aft, returning aircraft were expected to ditch in the sea, the pilot to be rescued by a destroyer and the aircraft recovered if possible.)

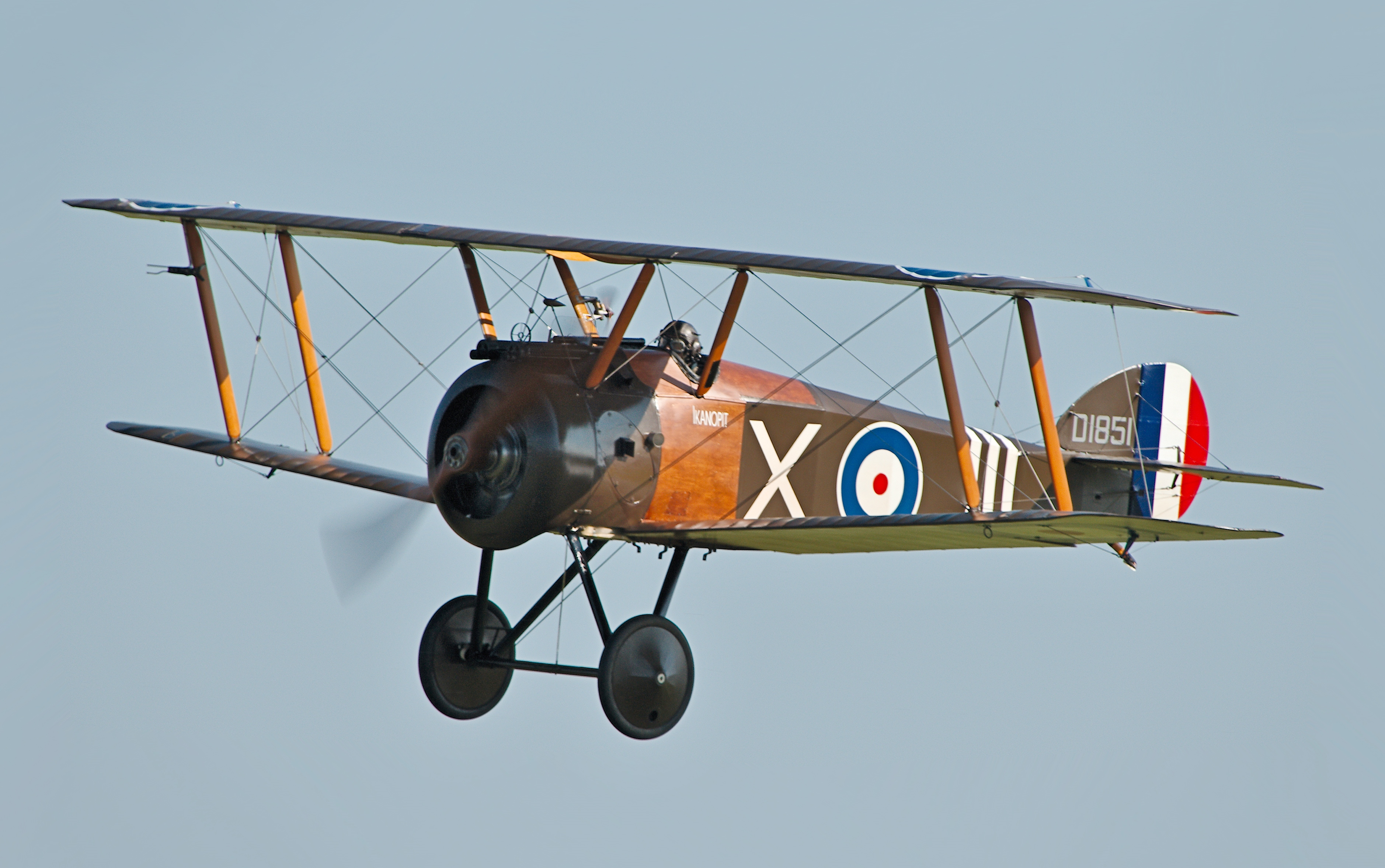
A Sopwith Camel photographed in 2018

The first three aircraft arrived over Tondern at 4:35, taking the base by surprise. There were three airship sheds, which the Germans had code-named Toska, Tobia and Toni. Toska, the largest, was a double shed and housed the airships L.54 and L.60. Tobias contained a captive balloon and Toni was being dismantled. The first wave attacked Toska and hit the shed with three bombs, detonating the gas bags of L.54 and L.60, destroying them by fire but not causing them to explode and destroy the shed. Another bomb from the first wave hit Tobias and damaged the balloon inside. The second wave destroyed the captive balloon afire and had several near misses on a wagon loaded with hydrogen cylinders. Despite the loss of the two airships only four men were injured.

Ground fire was directed at both waves but the only damage was an undercarriage wheel shot off a Camel from the second wave. Williams, Jackson and Dawson, doubtful that they had sufficient fuel to reach the British squadron offshore, landed in Denmark. Dickson, Yeulett and Smart flew to sea to find the British ships. Dickson ditched at 5:55 and Smart, having suffered engine trouble, ditched at 06:30. Yeulett was not heard from again and presumed drowned; it was supposed that he had been forced to ditch prematurely through fuel exhaustion. The British squadron waited for the other pilots until the Camels would have run out of fuel and after 7:00 the ships took cruising formation and made for home.

== Aftermath ==
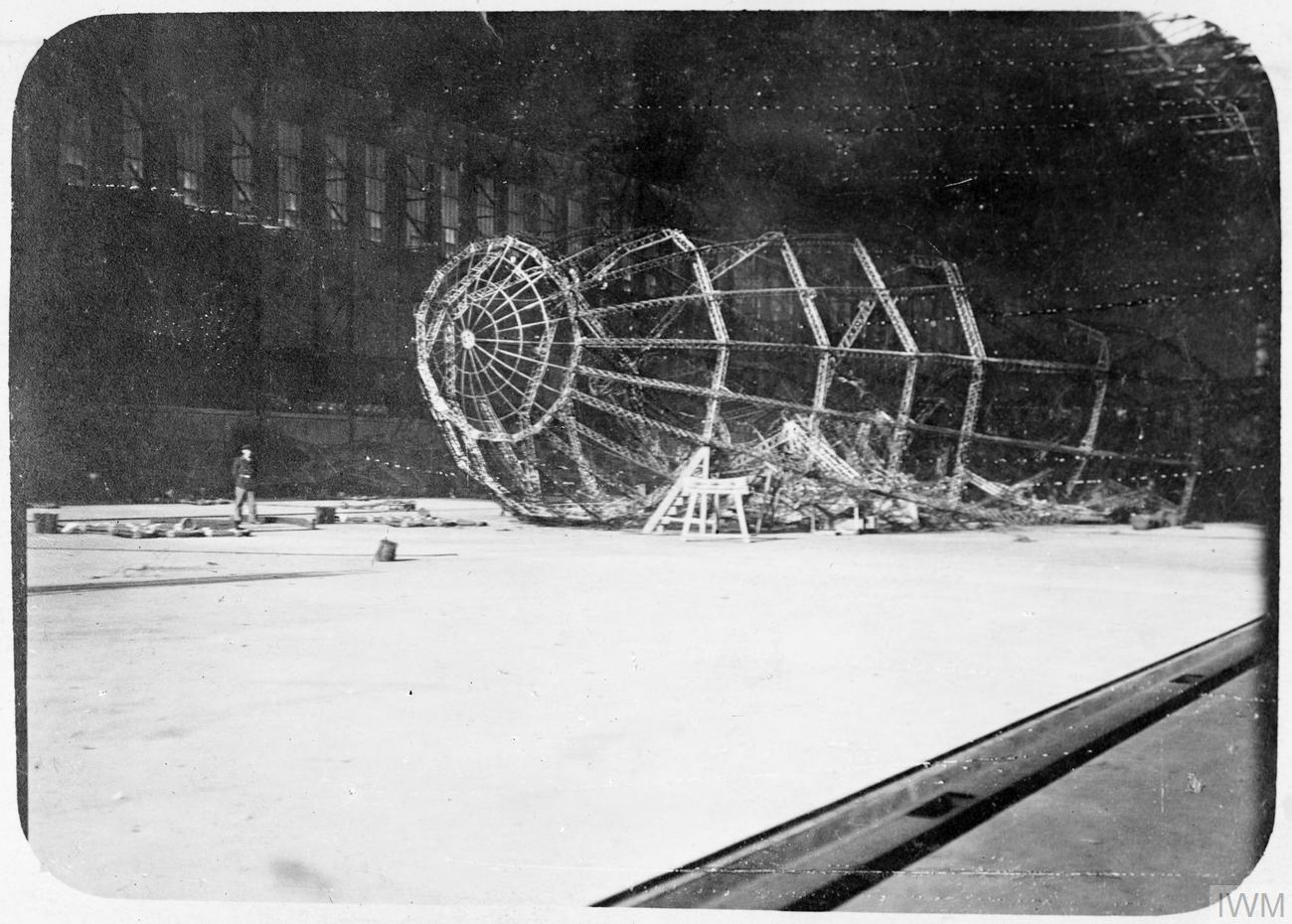
Wreckage of Zeppelins LZ 99 (L 54) and LZ 108 (L 60) in their hangars

The German Naval Airship Division quickly had Toska repaired but Tondern was abandoned, only to be used as an emergency landing site. Defences at the other bases were improved and a swathe of the countryside near Nordholz Naval Airbase was burned to prevent it being set alight by bombs.

=== Subsequent operations ===
From 1917 a raid on the German High Seas Fleet using the new torpedo-carrying Sopwith Cuckoo was planned. The Cuckoo was not available in sufficient numbers until early 1919 and the plan was not carried out. The concept was revived during the Second World War and in 1940 in the Battle of Taranto the battleships of the Italian Regia Marina were attacked, three being sunk at their moorings.

=== Casualties and awards ===
Dickson and Yeulett were awarded the Distinguished Service Order and Smart received a bar to his DSO. Yeulett's body was later recovered from the sea and buried in the cemetery of Nørre Havrvig church in Denmark.

== See also ==
- Raid on Cuxhaven
