= Robert Leckie (RCAF officer) =

Canadian air officer

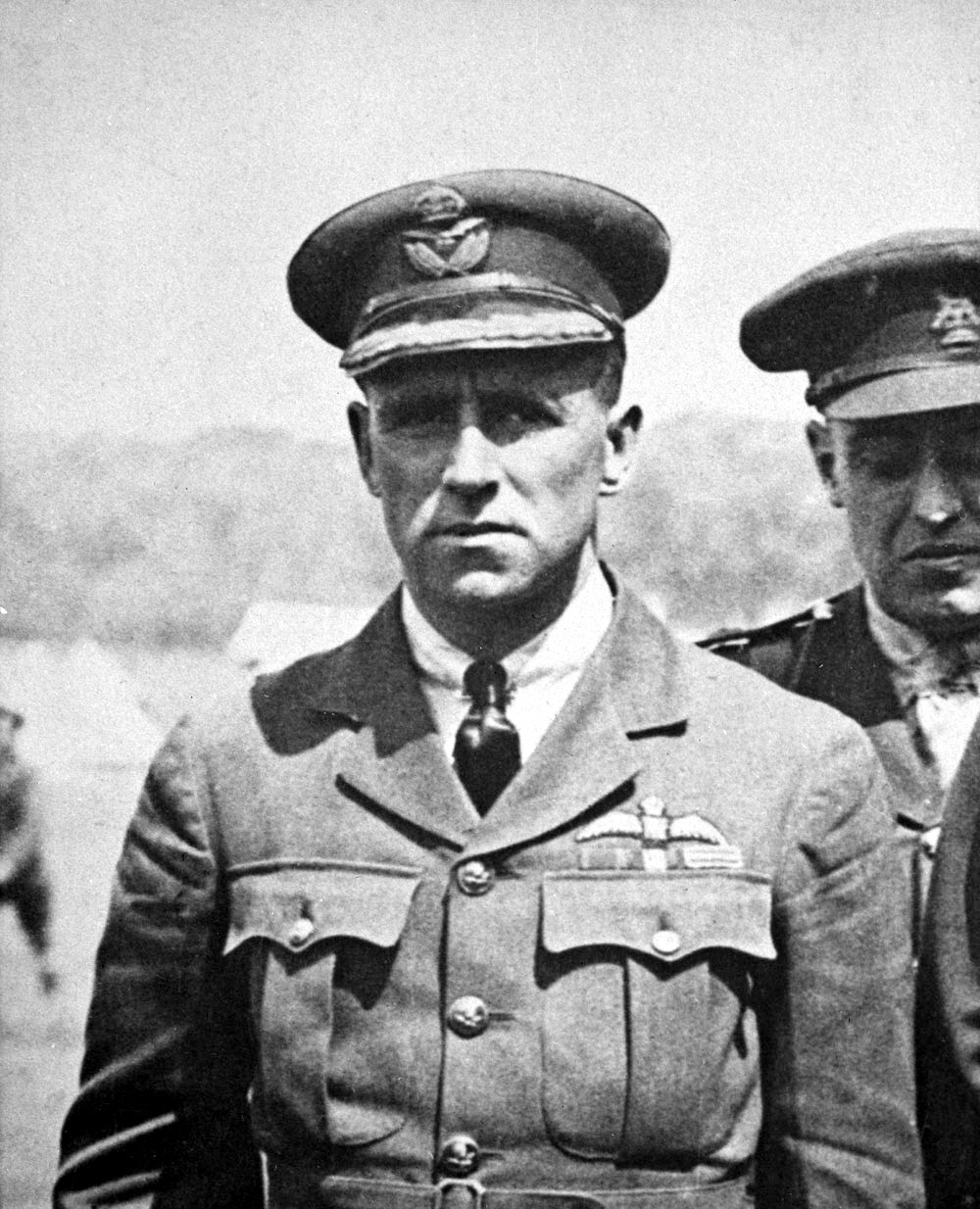
- Leckie in 1919
- Born: 16 April 1890; Glasgow, Scotland
- Died: 31 March 1975 (aged 84); Ottawa, Canada
- Military career
- Allegiance: United Kingdom; Canada
- Branch: Royal Navy (1915–18); Royal Air Force (1918–42); Royal Canadian Air Force (1942–47)
- Service years: 1915–1947
- Rank: Air marshal
- Commands: Chief of the Air Staff, RCAF (1944–47); RAF Mediterranean (1938–40); RAF Hendon (1933–35); No. 210 Squadron RAF (1931–33); RAF Bircham Newton (1929–31); No. 1 Wing CAF (1919); No. 228 Squadron RAF (1918–19)
- Conflicts: First World War; Second World War
- Awards: Companion of the Order of the Bath; Distinguished Service Order; Distinguished Service Cross; Distinguished Flying Cross; Canadian Forces' Decoration; Grand Officer of the Order of the Crown (Belgium); Grand Officer of the Order of the White Lion (Czechoslovakia); King Haakon VII Freedom Cross (Norway); Grand Cross of the Order of Polonia Restituta (Poland); Commander of the Legion of Merit (United States)

Air Marshal Robert Leckie, CB, DSO, DSC, DFC, CD (16 April 1890 – 31 March 1975) was an air officer in the Royal Air Force and later in the Royal Canadian Air Force, and served as Chief of the Air Staff of the Royal Canadian Air Force from 1944 to 1947. He initially served in the Royal Naval Air Service during the First World War, where he became known as one of "the Zeppelin killers from Canada", after shooting down two airships. During the inter-war period he served as a Royal Air Force squadron and station commander, eventually becoming the RAF's Director of Training in 1935, and was Air Officer Commanding RAF Mediterranean from 1938 until after the beginning of the Second World War. In 1940 he returned to Canada where he was primarily responsible for the British Commonwealth Air Training Plan, transferring to the Royal Canadian Air Force in 1942.

== Early life and background ==
Leckie was born in Glasgow, Scotland, where his father and grandfather were weavers. In 1909 his family emigrated to Canada, where he worked for his uncle John Leckie while living in West Toronto. (Note: The 1911 Census lists Leckie as living with his sisters, Mary (24) and Annette (15), and his mother, Annie (50), who is described as "head" of the family, suggesting that his father was dead (or had otherwise left the family) by this time.)

== First World War ==
Leckie was initially commissioned into the 1st Central Ontario Regiment, and in late 1915 paid Can$600 to begin flying training at the Curtiss Flying School on Toronto Island. However, he had completed only three hours of training in the Curtiss Model F flying boat at Hanlan's Point, when the school was forced to close for the winter. At the urging of Sir Charles Kingsmill, the Chief of the Naval Staff of the Royal Canadian Navy, the Royal Navy agreed to accept half of the class, and Leckie was sent to England. On 6 December 1915, he was commissioned as a probationary temporary flight sub-lieutenant in the Royal Naval Air Service, and posted to Royal Navy Air Station Chingford, for training. On 10 May 1916, having accumulated 33 hours and 3 minutes flying time, he was granted Royal Aero Club Aviator's Certificate No. 2923, and was then sent to RNAS Felixstowe for further training in flying boats. He was confirmed in his rank of flight sub-lieutenant in June, and in August was posted to RNAS Great Yarmouth to fly patrols over the North Sea.

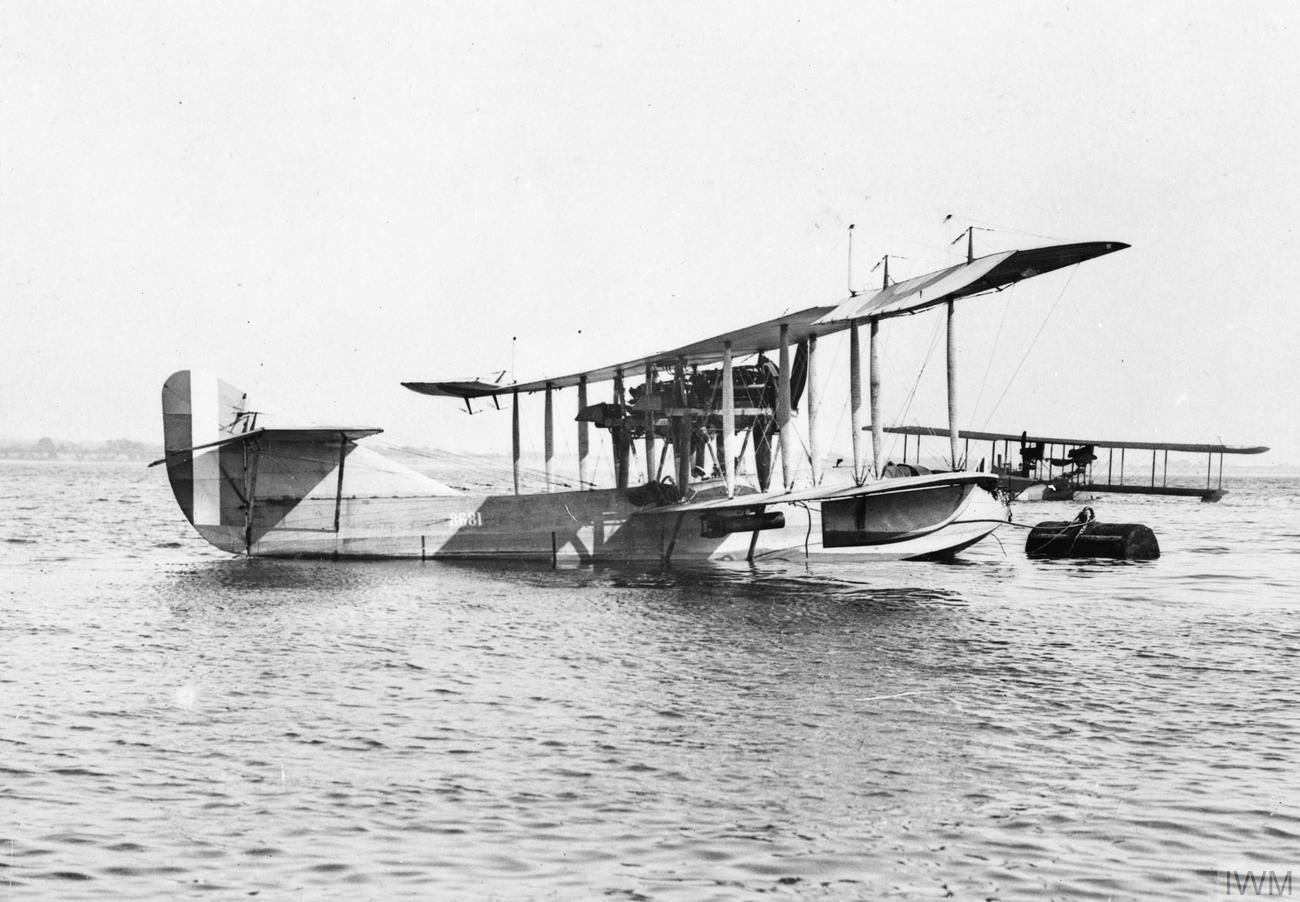
Curtiss H-12 'Large America' in RNAS service, c.1917.

Leckie's first success came on 14 May 1917, as pilot of Curtiss Model H-12 'Large America' No. 8666, under the command of Flight Lieutenant Christopher John Galpin. The aircraft left Great Yarmouth on patrol at 03.30 a.m. in poor weather with heavy rain and low cloud. The weather cleared as she approached the Texel, and at 4:45 a.m. she spotted the Terschelling Light Vessel, and a few minutes later Zeppelin L 22 about 10–15 miles away. The Curtiss increased speed and gained height, and Leckie took over the controls as Galpin manned the twin Lewis guns mounted in the bow. The Curtiss managed to approach to within half a mile before she was spotted, and the Zeppelin attempted to evade, but by then it was too late. The aircraft dived down alongside and Galpin fired an entire drum of incendiary bullets at a range of about 50 yards. The L 22 rapidly caught fire, and crashed into the sea. The Curtiss returned to Great Yarmouth by 7:50 a.m., and they found only two bullet holes, in the left upper wing and the hull amidships, where the Germans had returned fire. On 22 June, for his part in downing the L 22, Leckie was awarded the Distinguished Service Cross, while Galpin received the Distinguished Service Order. On 30 June Leckie was promoted to flight lieutenant.

Another memorable patrol began for Leckie at 10.35 a.m. on 5 September 1917, again flying Curtiss H-12 No. 8666 from Great Yarmouth, under Squadron Commander Vincent Nicholl. They were accompanied by a de Havilland DH.4 biplane, and were again heading for Terschelling. However, they were only part-way to their destination when they unexpectedly encountered the Zeppelins L 44 and L 46 accompanied by support ships. The British aircraft were hit by enemy fire, but pressed their attack on the L 44. Nicholl noted several hits on the Zeppelin from his guns, but it did not catch fire. Leckie then turned the aircraft to attack the L 46, but it had turned rapidly away and was out of range, as was the L 44 by the time he turned back. Both British aircraft had been hit, and the DH.4's engine soon failed. The Curtiss had also been hit in one engine and one wing was badly damaged. The DH.4 was forced to ditch into the sea, and Nicholl ordered Leckie to put the aircraft down to rescue the two crew. However, now with six men aboard, damaged, and in heavy seas Leckie was unable to take off again. Some 75 miles from the English coast, the aircraft began to taxi towards home. Their radio was waterlogged, but they did have four homing pigeons. Nicholl attached messages to the birds giving their position and course and sent them off at intervals. After four hours the aircraft ran out of fuel, and began to drift, so they improvised a sea anchor from empty fuel cans to steady it. That night the damaged wing tip broke off, and each man then had to spend two hours at a time outside balanced on the opposite wing to keep the broken wing from filling with water and dragging the aircraft under. After three days at sea, the six men were suffering badly. They had no food and only two gallons of drinking water, gained from draining the radiators of their water-cooled engines. Finally, at dawn on 8 September, as search operations were about to be called off, one of the pigeons was found, dead from exhaustion, by the coastguard station at Walcot, and shortly after midday they were rescued by the torpedo gunboat HMS Halcyon. Pigeon No. N.U.R.P./17/F.16331 was preserved, and originally kept in the officers' mess at RNAS Yarmouth, but is now on display at the RAF Museum Hendon. A brass plate on the display case bears the inscription "A very gallant gentleman".

On 31 December 1917 Leckie was appointed a flight commander. While on patrol on 20 February 1918, Leckie spotted an enemy submarine on the surface, and attacked it with bombs, seeing one strike the vessel as it dived, leaving a large oil slick. Leckie was subsequently awarded the Distinguished Service Order on 17 May 1918, only learning much later that he had not actually sunk it.

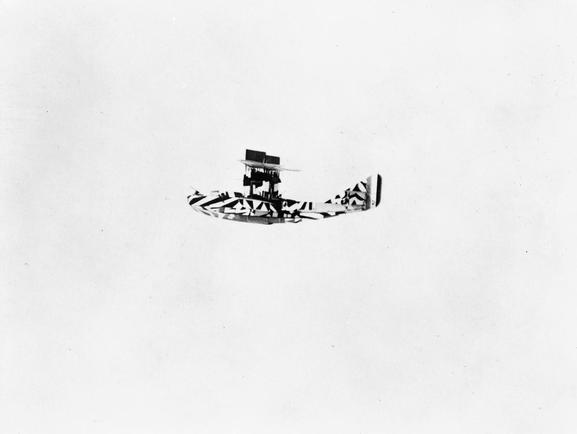
Felixstowe F.2A (N4283) in black and white "dazzle" scheme, flown by Captains Robert Leckie and Gerald Livock in March 1918.

On 1 April 1918, the Royal Naval Air Service was merged with the Army's Royal Flying Corps to form the Royal Air Force, and Leckie transferred to the new service with the rank of lieutenant (temporary captain), though on 8 April he was promoted to the temporary rank of major.

On 4 June 1918 Leckie led an offensive patrol of four Felixstowe F.2A flying boats and a Curtiss H.12 towards the Haaks Light Vessel off the Dutch coast. They saw no enemy aircraft until one of the F.2A's, number N.4533, was forced down with a broken fuel feed-pipe. Five enemy seaplanes appeared, but seemed more interested in attacking the crippled F.2A. The remaining aircraft circled N.4533 as it taxied towards to the Dutch coast (where the crew eventually burned their aircraft before being interned), until ten more German seaplanes appeared. Leckie promptly led his small force into a head on attack, and a dogfight ensued which lasted for 40 minutes. Despite further mechanical difficulties – two other F2A's also had problems with their fuel pipes and had to effect makeshift repairs while in the middle of the action – two German aircraft were shot down, and four badly damaged before the Germans broke off the action, for the loss of one F.2A and the Curtiss (its crew survived to be interned by the Dutch), and one man killed. Leckie's force returned to Great Yarmouth, and in his report he bitterly remarked "...these operations were robbed of complete success entirely through faulty petrol pipes... It is obvious that our greatest foes are not the enemy..."

On the afternoon of 5 August 1918 a squadron of five Zeppelins took off from Friedrichshafen. They headed for the east coast of England, timing their flight to arrive off the coast just after dark. The leading airship, L 70 was commanded by Kapitänleutnant Johann von Lossnitzer, but also had Fregattenkapitän Peter Strasser, the Führer der Luftschiffe ("Leader of Airships"), the commander of the Imperial German Navy's airship force, on board. However, the airship squadron was spotted while out at sea by the Lenman Tail lightship which signalled their course and position to the Admiralty. Responding to the report Major Egbert Cadbury jumped into the pilot's seat of the only aircraft available, a DH.4, while Leckie occupied the observer/gunner's position. After about an hour they spotted the L 70 and attacked, with Leckie firing eighty rounds of incendiary bullets into her. Fire rapidly consumed the airship as it plummeted into the sea. Cadbury and Leckie, and another pilot Lieutenant Ralph Edmund Keys, then attacked and damaged another Zeppelin, which promptly turned tail and headed for home. All three received the Distinguished Flying Cross.

A few days later, on 11 August 1918 Leckie took part in another operation over the North Sea. Zeppelins often shadowed British naval ships, while carefully operating at higher altitudes than anti-aircraft guns or flying boats could achieve, and out of range of land based aircraft, so the Harwich Light Cruiser Force set out with a Sopwith Camel lashed to a decked lighter towed by the destroyer HMS Redoubt. When Leckie's reconnaissance flight reported an approaching Zeppelin, the Redoubt steamed at full speed into the wind, allowing the Camel's pilot Lieutenant Culley to take off with only a five-yard run. Culley climbed to 18,800 feet, approached the L 53 out of the sun, and attacked with his twin Lewis guns, setting the airship on fire.

On 20 August 1918 Leckie was appointed commander of the newly formed No. 228 Squadron, flying the Curtis H-12 and Felixstowe F.2A out of Great Yarmouth. Within three months the armistice brought the fighting to an end.

== Inter-war career ==
Leckie remained with the RAF until 31 March 1919 when he was transferred to the unemployed list, and simultaneously seconded to the Canadian Air Force with the temporary rank of lieutenant colonel, to command the 1st Wing, Canadian Air Force. This unit comprised No. 81 Squadron (No. 1 Canadian), flying S.E.5 and Sopwith Dolphin fighters, and No. 123 Squadron (No. 2 Canadian), flying Airco DH.9A bombers, and was based at RAF Shoreham, Sussex. The Canadian Wing had been formed in August 1918 at RAF Upper Heyford, Oxfordshire, but never saw active service, and was eventually disbanded when the Canadian Expeditionary Force returned home.

On 1 August 1919 Leckie was granted a permanent commission in the Royal Air Force with the rank of major (later squadron leader), relinquishing his commission in the 1st Central Ontario Regiment of the Overseas Military Forces of Canada on the 31st.

On 15 December 1919 he was seconded for duty with the Canadian Air Board serving as Superintendent of Flying Operations. In this role he played a central role in the development of Canadian civil aviation, organizing and taking part in the first trans-Canada flight between Halifax and Vancouver. Leckie and Major Basil Hobbs flew from Halifax to Winnipeg between 7 and 10 October 1920, before other pilots and aircraft took over, finally arriving in Vancouver on the 17th.

Leckie's secondment ended on 27 May 1922, and he returned to Britain to be posted to the No. 1 School of Technical Training at RAF Halton on 8 June. On 25 September he was posted the RAF Depot (Inland Area) as a supernumerary officer, in order to attend the Royal Navy Staff College. On 5 July 1923 he was posted to the Headquarters of RAF Coastal Area.

On 1 January 1926 Leckie was promoted to wing commander, and on 16 March was posted to Headquarters, Mediterranean, where on 30 March he joined the aircraft carrier HMS Hermes to serve as Senior Air Force Officer. He returned to the depot at RAF Uxbridge on 11 May 1927, and on 26 August was posted to Headquarters, Coastal Area, while he waited for HMS Courageous to be commissioned. Following the completion of her conversion to an aircraft carrier Courageous was commissioned at Devonport on 14 February 1928, and on 21 February Leckie joined her as Senior Air Force Officer.

Leckie returned to dry land on 5 September 1929, when he was appointed commander of RAF Bircham Newton, Norfolk. On 11 April 1931 he became commander of No. 210 Squadron RAF, initially based at Felixstowe, and then RAF Pembroke Dock, flying the Supermarine Southampton Mk. II. On 1 January 1933 Leckie was promoted to group captain, and on 30 January he was appointed both Superintendent of the RAF Reserve and commander of RAF Hendon. On 21 August 1935 Leckie was also appointed an additional Air Aide-de-Camp to King George V, attending the King's funeral in that capacity on 28 January 1936, and was appointed Air Aide-de-Camp to King Edward VIII on 1 July 1936. Leckie was appointed Director of Training at the Air Ministry on 5 October 1936, taking over from Air Commodore Arthur Tedder, and was promoted to air commodore on 1 January 1937, handing over the post as Air Aide-de-Camp to the King to Group Captain Keith Park the same day. Leckie's tenure as Director of Training ended on 28 November 1938, and on 2 December 1938 he was appointed Air Officer Commanding, RAF Mediterranean, based at Malta.

== Second World War ==
In 1940, Leckie was seconded to the Royal Canadian Air Force to establish the British Commonwealth Air Training Plan (BCATP) in Canada. By the end of the war BCATP had trained 131,553 air crew from 11 countries. On 5 August 1941 he was promoted to the acting rank of air vice-marshal, and served as Member of the Air Council for Training. On 6 April 1942 Leckie was placed on the RAF retired list on accepting a commission in the Royal Canadian Air Force. On 2 June 1943 he was made a Companion of the Order of the Bath (CB). From 1 January 1944 until 31 August 1947 Leckie served as Chief of Staff, RCAF with the rank of air marshal.

For his service during the Second World War Leckie received the Order of Polonia Restituta (1st class) from the President of the Republic of Poland on 1 May 1945, and was also made a Commander of the Legion of Merit by the United States, and a Grand Officer of both the Belgian Order of the Crown and the Czechoslovak Order of the White Lion. In July 1948 he was awarded the King Haakon VII Freedom Cross by the King of Norway "in recognition of distinguished services rendered in the cause of the Allies".

== Post-war career ==
Leckie retired from the Royal Canadian Air Force on 1 September 1947, though he continued to take an interest in aviation, serving as a special consultant to the Air Cadet League.

Air Marshal Leckie died on 31 March 1975, the last surviving wartime Chief of the Air Staff, aged 84. He was survived by his widow, Bernice, and two sons.

Leckie was inducted into the Canadian Aviation Hall of Fame in 1988.

== Footnotes ==
Military offices
Preceded by Paul Maltby	Air Officer Commanding RAF Mediterranean; 1938–1940	Succeeded by Forster Maynard
Preceded by Lloyd Breadner	Chief of the Air Staff (RCAF); 1944–1947	Succeeded by Wilfred Curtis
