= HMS Yarmouth (1911) =

Town-class light cruiser

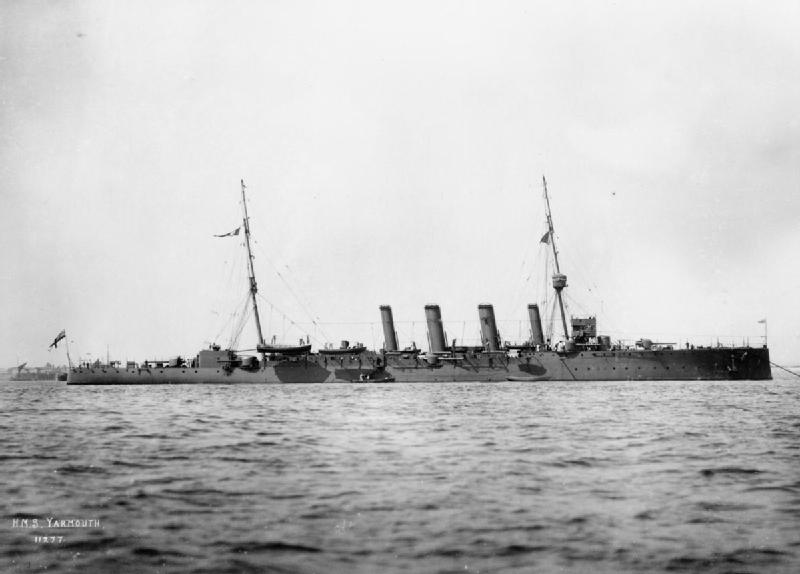
- Yarmouth in 1912

History

United Kingdom
- Name: Yarmouth
- Namesake: Great Yarmouth
- Builder: London & Glasgow Co.
- Laid down: 27 January 1910
- Launched: 12 April 1911
- Commissioned: April 1912
- Fate: Sold for scrap, 2 July 1929

General characteristics (as built)
- Class & type: Town-class light cruiser
- Displacement: 5,275 long tons (5,360 t)
- Length: 430 ft (131.1 m) p/p; 453 ft (138.1 m) o/a
- Beam: 47 ft 6 in (14.5 m)
- Draught: 15 ft 6 in (4.72 m) (mean)
- Installed power: 12 × Yarrow boilers; 22,000 shp (16,000 kW)
- Propulsion: 2 × shafts; 2 × Brown-Curtis steam turbines
- Speed: 25 knots (46 km/h; 29 mph)
- Range: 5,610 nmi (10,390 km; 6,460 mi) at 10 knots (19 km/h; 12 mph)
- Complement: 475
- Armament: 8 × single 6 in (152 mm) guns; 4 × single 3 pdr (47 mm (1.9 in)) guns; 2 × 21 in (533 mm) torpedo tubes
- Armour: Deck: .75–2 in (19–51 mm); Conning tower: 4 in (102 mm)

HMS Yarmouth was a Town-class light cruiser of the Royal Navy launched on 12 April 1911 from the yards of the London & Glasgow Co. She was part of the Weymouth subgroup.

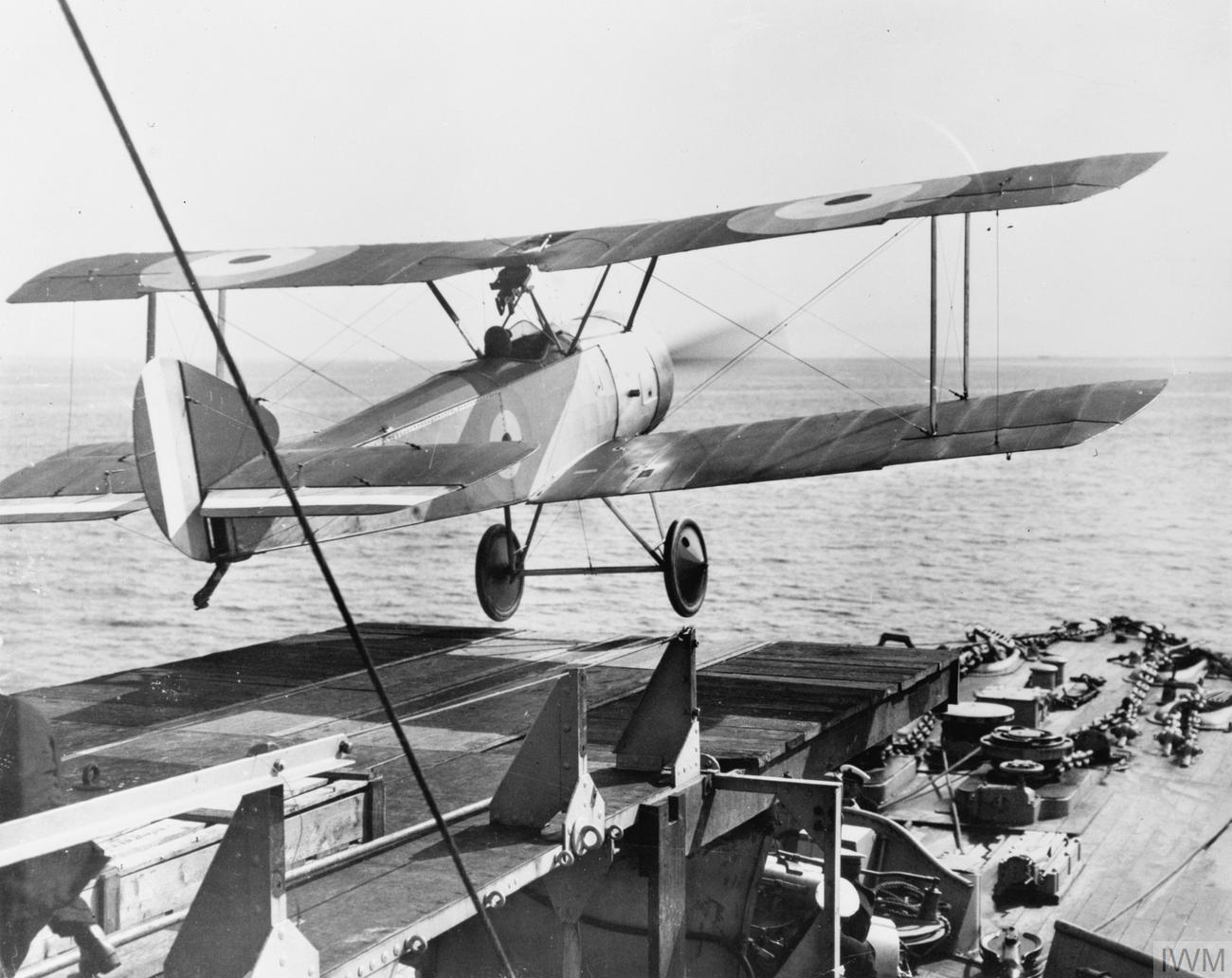
The Sopwith Pup of Flight Commander Rutland takes off from a platform on the forward gun turret of HMS Yarmouth, June 1917.

On the outbreak of the First World War, Yarmouth was on the China Station, and later in 1914, she was involved in the hunt for the German commerce raider SMS Emden. In October that year she captured two German colliers. She returned to home waters in December 1914 and was assigned to the 2nd Light Cruiser Squadron of the Grand Fleet, and in February 1915 to 3rd Light Cruiser Squadron. Whilst serving with this squadron, she took part in the Battle of Jutland on 31 May-1 June 1916.

On 28 June 1917, Royal Naval Air Service Flight Commander F. J. Rutland took off in a Sopwith Pup from a flying-off platform mounted on the roof of one of Yarmouth's gun turrets, the first such successful launch of an aircraft in history. On 21 August a Pup flown by Flight Sub-Lieutenant B. A. Smart flown from Yarmouth shot down the Zeppelin L 23 near Bovbjerg, Denmark.

HMS Yarmouth re-commissioned at Colombo, Ceylon, in June, 1918. She served as part of the 3rd Light Cruiser Squadron. She re-commissioned at Colombo again on 21st March, 1919. The flag of Rear-Admiral The Hon. Edward Stafford Fitzherbert, CB, Commander-in-Chief on the Africa Station, was flown in Yarmouth temporarily. In 1919, she stopped at Tristan da Cunha, the first ship in ten years, to inform the islanders of the outcome of World War I. After the war, she joined the 7th Light Cruiser Squadron on the South America Station.

Yarmouth was sold for scrapping on 2 July 1929 to the Alloa South Breaking Company, of Rosyth.
