= Abdy (surname) =

Abdy is a surname. Notable people with the surname include:

- Anthony Abdy (British Army officer) (1856–1924), British Army officer and cricketer
- Anthony Abdy (1579–1640) (baptised 1579 – 1640), English merchant
- Sir Anthony Abdy, 5th Baronet (c.1720–1775), British barrister and politician
- Edward Strutt Abdy (1791–1846), English legal academic and abolitionist
- Jane, Lady Abdy (1934–2015), English art dealer
- John Thomas Abdy (1822–1899), English legal scholar and academic
- Sir John Abdy, 4th Baronet (c.1714–1759), British politician
- Maria Abdy (1797–1867), English poet
- Robert Abdy (cricketer) (1860–1899), English Royal Navy officer and cricketer
- Pamela Abdy (born 1973), American film producer
- Richard Abdy (born 1970), British numismatist
- Sir Robert Abdy, 3rd Baronet (1688–1748), British politician
- Rowena Meeks Abdy (1887–1945), American modernist painter
- Sir Thomas Abdy, 1st Baronet, of Albyns (1810–1877), British politician
- Sir William Abdy, 7th Baronet (1779–1868), English politician and baronet
