= Anthony Abdy =

Anthony Abdy may refer to:

- Anthony Abdy (1579–1640), English East India merchant
- Sir Anthony Abdy, 2nd Baronet (1655–1704), of the Abdy baronets
- Sir Anthony Abdy, 3rd Baronet (1688–1733), of the Abdy baronets
- Sir Anthony Abdy, 5th Baronet (c. 1720–1775), British lawyer and MP for Knaresborough
- Anthony Abdy (British Army officer) (1856–1924), British cricketer for Essex and Hampshire

== See also ==
- Abdy (surname)
