= William Harvey (disambiguation) =

William Harvey (1578–1657) was an English physician who made the first exact description of blood circulation.

William, Will, Willie, Billie or Bill Harvey may also refer to:

== Academics ==
- William Harvey (priest) (1810–1883), English cleric and academic, amateur cricketer
- William R. Harvey (born 1941), African American educator, academic administrator, and businessman
- William F. Harvey (fl. 1980s), American law professor

== Arts and entertainment ==
- William Harvey (artist) (1796–1866), English wood-engraver
- William Alexander Harvey (1874–1951), English architect
- Bill Harvey (bandleader) (1918–1964), American bandleader
- William S. Harvey (1920–1993), American graphic designer and art director with Elektra Records

== Military and intelligence ==
- William Edwin Harvey (general) (1871–1922), lawyer and U.S. Army officer
- William Frederick James Harvey (1897–1972), World War I flying ace
- William King Harvey (1915–1976), CIA officer
- William James St. John Harvey (1872–1916), British Army officer

== Politicians ==
=== British members of parliament ===
- William Harvey (1663–1731), MP for Appleby, Essex, Old Sarum, and Weymouth and Melcombe Regis
- William Harvey (1689–1742), MP for Old Sarum
- William Harvey (1714–1763), MP for Essex
- William Harvey (1754–1779), MP for Essex
- W. E. Harvey (William Edwin Harvey, 1852–1914), MP for North East Derbyshire 1907–1914

=== Other politicians ===
- William Harvey (Canadian politician) (1821–1874), Canadian politician
- William Humphrey Harvey (1869–1935), South Australian politician
- William West Harvey (1869–1958), Justice of the Kansas Supreme Court
- William Harvey (Australian politician) (1882–1954), South Australian politician
- William Bruce Harvey (1906–1954), Canadian politician
- Billy Harvey (politician) (1932–2006), member of the Mississippi State Senate

== Sports ==
=== Association football ===
- Bill Harvey (footballer, born 1896) (1896–1972), English footballer (Sheffield Wednesday, Birmingham, Southend), manager (Birmingham, Chesterfield, Gillingham) and cricketer
- Bill Harvey (footballer, born 1908) (1908–1978), English footballer for Barnsley, Chesterfield and Darlington
- Bill Harvey (footballer, born 1920) (1920–2002), English footballer and manager of Luton Town and Grimsby Town
- Willie Harvey (footballer) (1929–2014), Scottish footballer

=== Other sports ===
- Bill Harvey (baseball) (1908–1989), American Negro leagues baseball player
- Bill Harvey (Australian footballer) (1926–1957), Australian footballer with North Melbourne
- Billy Harvey (footballer) (1892–1917), Australian rules footballer with Essendon
- Billie Harvey (1950–2007), racing driver
- Willie Harvey Jr. (born 1996), American football linebacker

== Others ==
- William Harvey (officer of arms) (1510–1567), English herald and Norroy King of Arms
- William Harvey (Bible Christian) (1787–1870, English cotton mill owner, deacon, and activist
- William Henry Harvey (1811–1866), Irish botanist
- William Hope Harvey (1851–1936), "free silver" activist
- Will Harvey (born 1966/67), American software developer and businessman
- William Frederick Harvey (1873–1948), director of the Central Research Institute in India, vice president of the Royal Society of Edinburgh
- W. F. Harvey (William Fryer Harvey, 1885–1937), English writer

== Other uses ==
- William Harvey (department store), a department store located in Guildford

== See also ==
- William Hervey (disambiguation)
- Harvey Williams (disambiguation)
