= Robert Abdy =

Robert Abdy may refer to:

- Sir Robert Abdy, 3rd Baronet (1688–1748), British politician
- Robert Abdy (cricketer) (1860–1899), English cricketer and Royal Navy officer
- Robert Abdy (master) on List of Masters of Balliol College
- Sir Robert Abdy, 1st Baronet (c. 1615–1670) of the Abdy baronets of Albyns (1660)
- Sir Robert Henry Edward Abdy, 5th Baronet (1896–1976) of the Abdy baronets of Albyns (1849)
- Robert Abdy (born 1978), heir apparent to the Abdy baronets of Albyns (1849)
