= William Abdy =

William Abdy is the name of:

- Sir William Abdy, 4th Baronet (1689–1750), English landowner
- Sir William Abdy, 6th Baronet (ca. 1732–1803), Royal Navy officer
- Sir William Abdy, 7th Baronet (1779–1868), English landowner and Member of Parliament for Malmesbury
- Sir William Abdy, 2nd Baronet (1844–1910), English aristocrat

== See also ==
- Abdy baronets
