= General Harvey =

General Harvey may refer to:

- Celia Harvey (born c. 1962), British Army major general
- Charles Harvey (Indian Army officer) (1888–1969), British Indian Army major general
- Daniel Harvey (British Army officer) (c. 1664–1732), British Army general
- Edward Harvey (British Army officer)y (1718–1778), British Army lieutenant general
- Frederick Maurice Watson Harvey (1888–1980), Canadian Expeditionary Force brigadier general
- John Harvey (British Army officer) (1778–1852), British Army lieutenant general
- William Edwin Harvey (United States Army officer) (1871–1922), U.S. Army brigadier general
