= Minworth Greaves =

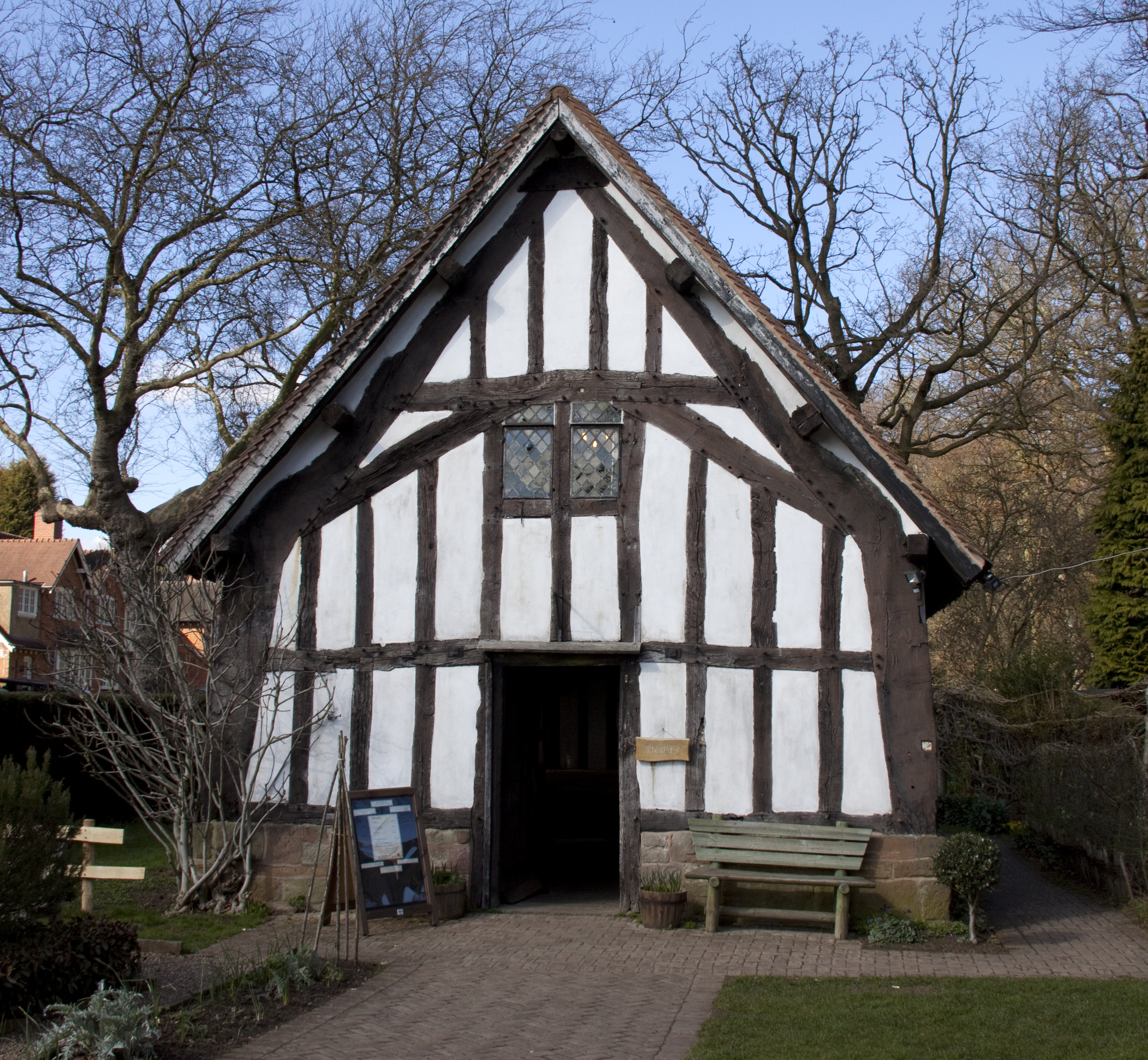
- Minworth Greaves
- Interactive map of the Minworth Greaves area

General information
- Type: Medieval hall house
- Location: Maple Road, Bournville, Birmingham, England
- Coordinates: 52.43077°N 1.93426°W
- Construction started: 14th century or before
- Renovated: 1929-32

Technical details
- Structural system: Cruck-frame

Design and construction
- Designations: Grade II listed

Renovating team
- Architect: William Alexander Harvey

Website
- www.sellymanormuseum.org.uk/explore-visit-us/minworth-greaves/

Minworth Greaves is a timber cruck-framed, Grade II listed building in Bournville, an area of Birmingham, England. It is thought to date from the 14th-century or earlier, possibly as early as 1250. It is owned by the Bournville Village Trust. Minworth Greaves is situated next to Selly Manor, and is run as part of Selly Manor Museum. It was originally built in Minworth, near Sutton Coldfield to the North of Birmingham. After falling into extreme disrepair, it was purchased by George Cadbury and re-built by Laurence Cadbury in 1932 in the grounds of Selly Manor.

== History ==
The building is timber framed with plaster infill. The old part is a two bay cruck-framed hall. The main roof is formed by a bent oak tree, split in half lengthways to form a pair of cruck blades. There is also the modern addition of a thin bay with a gallery. The original windows were smaller and higher up than in the reconstruction and were formed by cloth soaked in animal fat, rather than glass.

== Relocation ==
Minworth Greaves originally stood in Minworth, to the north of Birmingham. It fell into disrepair, leaving only a skeleton of the building. It was purchased by George Cadbury and re-built by Laurence Cadbury in 1932 in the grounds of Selly Manor, which had been similarly dismantled and reconstructed by the Cadburys by 1916. Only the cruck-beamed great hall and some of main timbers could be saved and these were reconstructed to show what a cruck-beamed hall was thought to look like. The restoration was overseen by architect William Alexander Harvey.

In 1921 an 18 feet (5.5 m), eight-legged oak table dated from 1630 was brought for display in Minworth Greaves from Crook Hall in Lancashire, which is now demolished. The table is inscribed, 'an arelome to this house forever. P.C.'. Minworth Greaves became a Grade II listed building in 1952. It is now open to the public and used to host exhibitions.
