= Abdy baronets of Moores (1660) =

Extinct baronetcy in the Baronetage of England

Abdy baronets
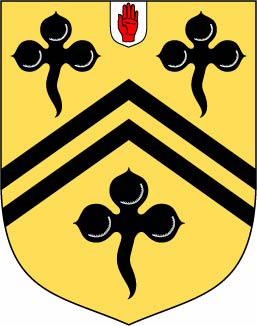
- Escutcheon of the Abdy baronets of Moores
- Creation date: 1660
- Status: extinct
- Extinction date: c.1662

The Abdy Baronetcy, of Moores, in the County of Essex, was created in the Baronetage of England on 22 June 1660 for John Abdy. It became extinct on his death c.1662.

== Abdy baronets, of Moores, Essex (1660) ==
- Sir John Abdy, 1st Baronet (c. 1620–1662) was the third son of Anthony Abdy, alderman of London, and younger brother of Sir Thomas Abdy, 1st Baronet and Sir Robert Abdy, 1st Baronet. He was knighted and subsequently created a baronet on 22 June 1660. Sir John died unmarried around 1662 and left his estates to his brother, Sir Robert.

== See also ==
- Abdy baronets
