= John Abdy =

John Abdy may refer to:

- Sir John Abdy (politician) (c. 1714–1759), British baronet and politician
- John Thomas Abdy (1822–1899), Regius Professor of Civil Law at Cambridge University
- Sir John Abdy, 2nd Baronet (1643–1691) of the Abdy baronets
- Sir John Abdy, 1st Baronet (c. 1620–1662) of the Abdy baronets
