= Selby Clewer =

English architect

Selby James Clewer (6 April 1917 – 12 April 2001) was an English architect.

Born in Morton, Shropshire, to James Clewer (1889–1968) and Minnie Thacker (1883–1918), with his father a policeman, he spent his childhood in many different areas in the Midlands. His mother died in 1918. While studying at the Birmingham School of Architecture he won the Pugin Prize.

== Work abroad ==
In 1940, as a conscientious objector, he joined the Friends' Ambulance Unit and volunteered for the China Convoy. They set out in May 1941 and arrived in Rangoon in July. Later he moved to China and was responsible for the design of what became the Convoy HQ in Kutsing, (Chuxiong City) Yunnan. On 8 April 1943 he arrived in Liverpool on the RMS Mauretania.

He married (Hilda) Dorothy Street at St Petrock's Church, Parracombe in the same year. He then went to Ethiopia, where he was responsible for designing the Princess Tsahai Memorial Hospital, (renamed the Armed Forces General Hospital after the revolution in 1974, and now Torhayloch Hospital). After a year, his wife Dorothy joined him and they stayed there for nine years. He became Chief Architect to the Abyssinian Ministry of Education.

== Work in England ==
Having joined the Society of Friends, he went to work for the Bournville Village Trust and later became Chief Architect, a post he held for 21 years. In 1966 he designed the chapel at St Francis of Assisi's Church, Bournville. He was responsible for the design of Quinton Methodist Church in 1968, St. David's Church, Shenley Green which opened in 1970 and the Friends Meeting House in Redditch, 1974, and the adjoining housing complex, built for the Redditch Friends Housing Trust.

Other buildings include:

- Shard End Boys' Club, Brownfield Road, Shard End, Birmingham 1960
- Northfield Boys' Club, Vineyard Road, Northfield, Birmingham 1960 (now demolished)

On retirement, Selby was appointed Administrator of Hanbury Hall and was able to raise the profile of this historic house. Later he and his with moved to Ice House Cottage, in the grounds of the Hall, (where many remember buying garden produce, ice cream and honey sold in aid of charities) and finally to Studley.

He died suddenly on 12 April 2001.
