= St Francis of Assisi's Church, Bournville =

St Francis of Assisi's Church
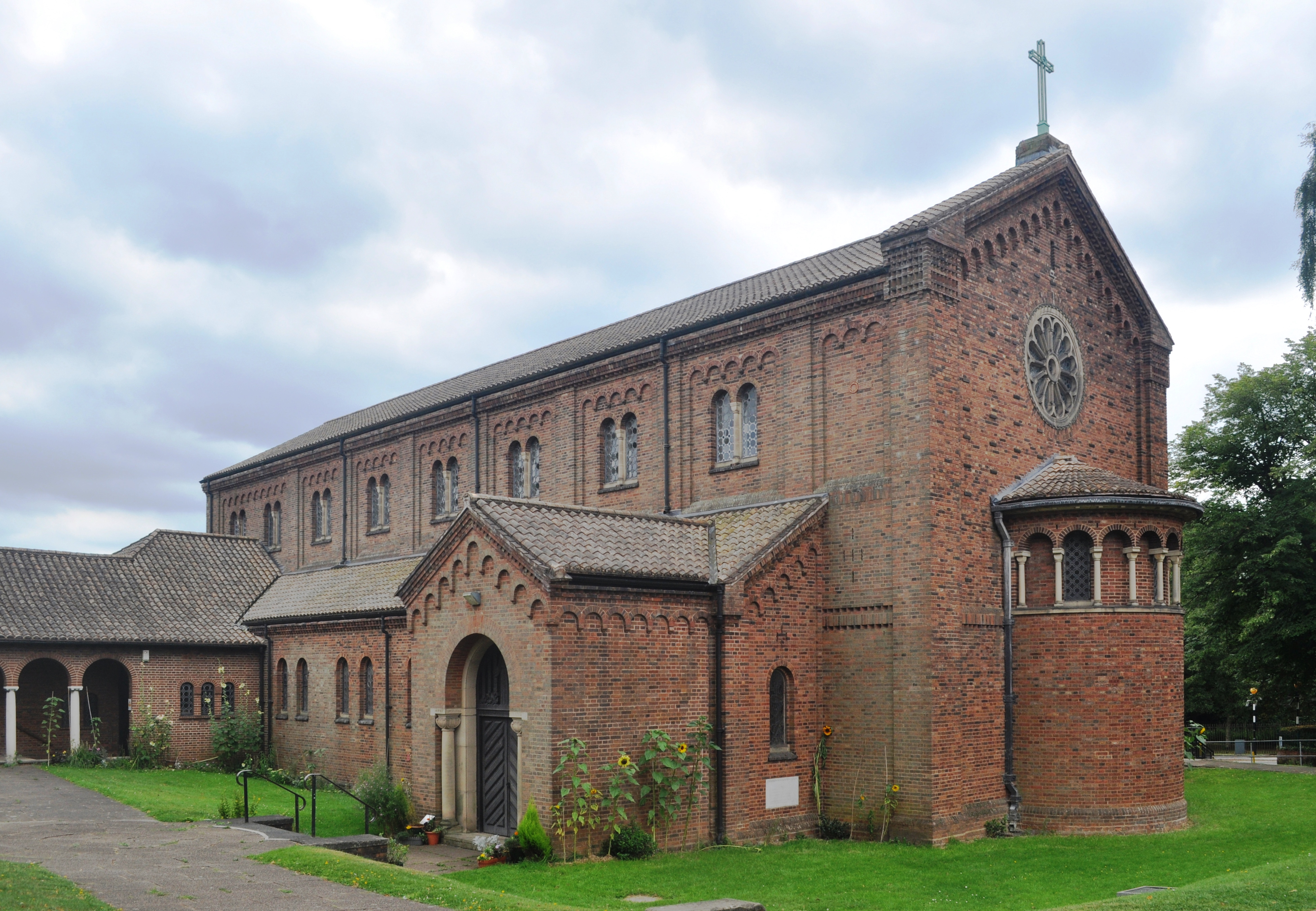
- The church in August 2024
- St Francis of Assisi's Church
- 52.4289°N 1.9354°W
- Denomination: Church of England
- Churchmanship: Broad Church
- Website: www.bournvilleparishchurch.org.uk

History
- Dedication: St. Francis of Assisi

Administration
- Province: Canterbury
- Diocese: Birmingham
- Parish: Bournville

Clergy
- Vicar: Revd Peter Babington

St Francis of Assisi's Church, Bournville is a parish church in the Church of England in Bournville, Birmingham.

== History ==
Land had been set aside for a church and church hall by Bournville Village Trust in 1905. The church hall (now part of the community centre) was built in 1913, and the church building was consecrated in 1925. It was designed by William Alexander Harvey. The font was given as a memorial in 1984. It is of Portland stone and was designed and made by John Poole.

The chapel was designed by Selby Clewer and built in 1966. It was given by Laurence and Joyce Cadbury in memory of three of their children.

== Organ ==
The organ was built by Messrs. Nicholson & Co. of Worcester. It was given to the church by the Cadbury Brothers and had originally been located in The Girls' Dining Room in the Bournville Works.

A specification of the organ can be found on the National Pipe Organ Register.

== Current status ==
The church has recently had extensive restoration including a new roof, new lighting scheme, improved ramped access and redecoration. It is a Grade II listed building.
