= St David's Church, Shenley Green =

Church in Birmingham, England

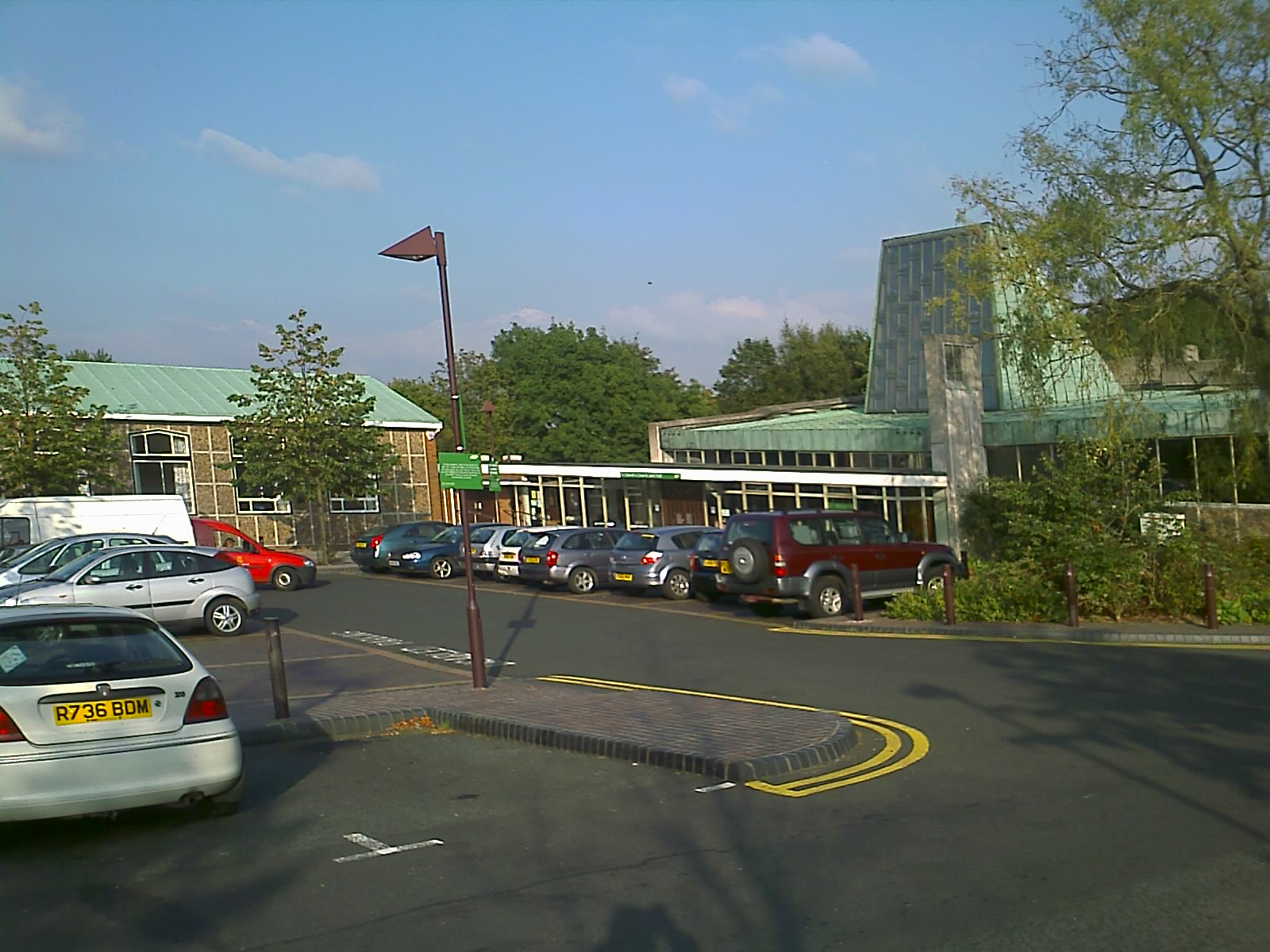
- St David's Church, Shenley Green
- St David's Church, Shenley Green
- 52.4260°N 1.9735°W
- Country: England
- Denomination: Church of England
- Churchmanship: Broad Church
- Website: stdavidsshenleygreen.com

History
- Dedication: St David
- Consecrated: 9 May 1970

Architecture
- Architect: Selby Clewer
- Groundbreaking: 1 March 1969
- Construction cost: £55,000 (equivalent to £754,400 in 2025)

Administration
- Province: Canterbury
- Diocese: Birmingham
- Archdeaconry: Birmingham
- Deanery: King's Norton
- Parish: Shenley Green

Clergy
- Vicar: Paul Cho

St David's Church, Shenley Green is a parish church of the Church of England located in Shenley Green, Birmingham.

== History ==
Until 1970 services were held in the church hall which was opened in 1962. In February 1969, twelve Birmingham Scouts hauled 3 stones from St David’s Cathedral in Pembrokeshire to Shenley Green. The 200 mile journey took 56 hours with the scouts working in relay teams of 4 pulling a hand trek cart. The stones were later included in the new church as foundation and consecration stones. The church was built between 1969 and 1970. It was consecrated on 9 May 1970 by Laurie Brown, Bishop of Birmingham.

It was designed by the architects of the Bournville Village Trust under the direction of Selby Clewer. Part of the parish was taken from that of St Gabriel's Church, Weoley Castle.

The vicarage adjacent to the church was built in 1969 for a cost of £11,585 (equivalent to £168,300 in 2025).

== Architecture ==
The church is dominated by its large lantern tower which not only illuminates the interior but also acts as a local landmark. The distinctive green copper roof was replaced with stainless steel in 2011-2012 after a number of thefts of copper sheeting.

The consecration stone, and dedication stones were brought from St David's Cathedral by the local scout troop in a handcart.

== Organ ==
The church contains a pipe organ dating from 1970 by Bowen of Northampton. It was enlarged in 1999 by Trevor Tipple of Worcester. A specification of the organ can be found on the National Pipe Organ Register.

== List of incumbents ==
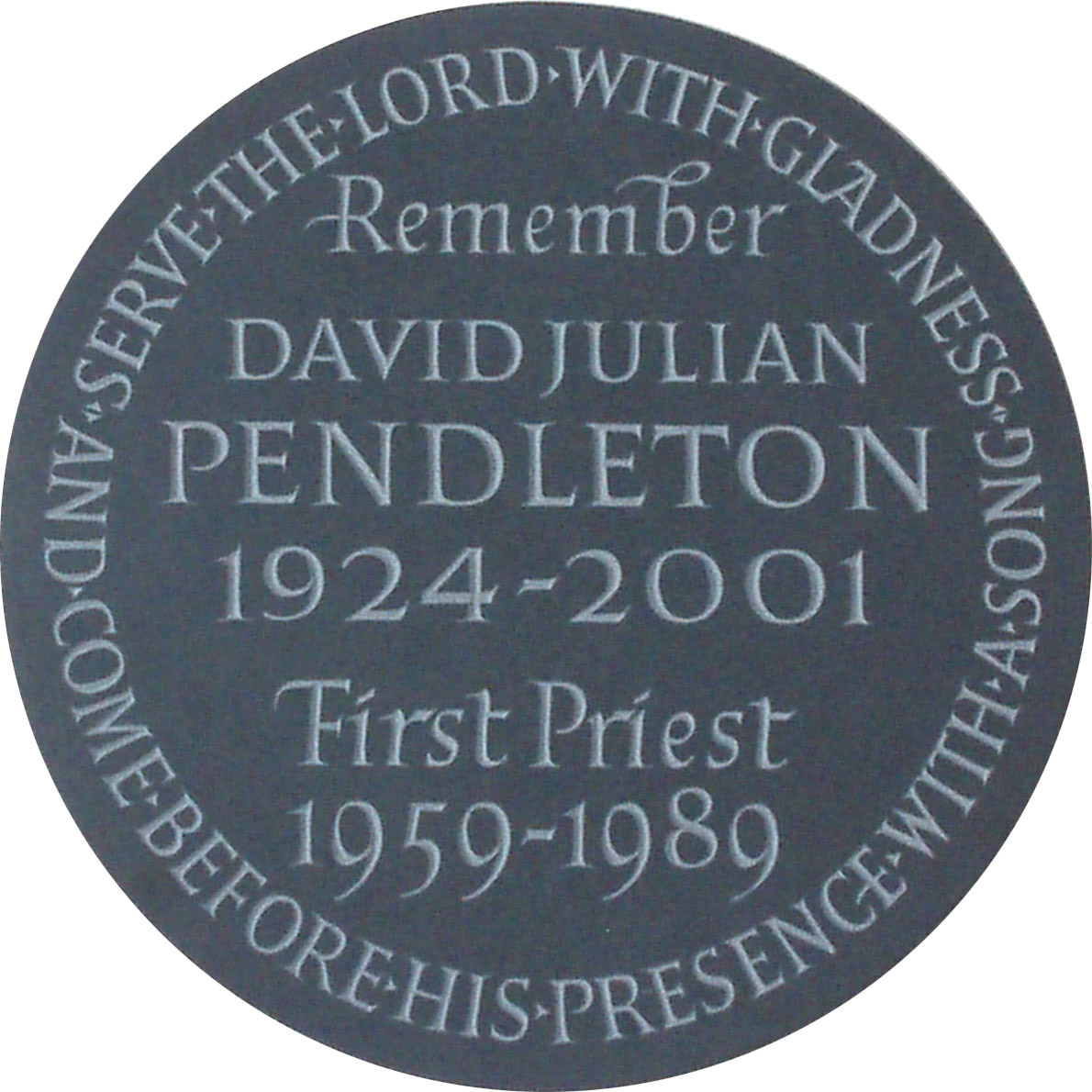

- David Pendleton, 1959–1989
- Chris Jackson, 1989–2001
- Nick Evans, 2002–2015
- Mark Bennett, 2016–2020

== Sources ==
- St David's Church History. Church pamphlet
