= Abdy baronets of Albyns (1849) =

Baronetcy in the Baronetage of the United Kingdom

Abdy baronets
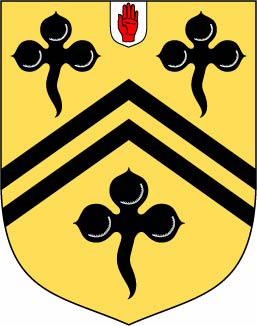
- Escutcheon of the Abdy baronets of Albyns (1849)
- Creation date: 1849, although 1850 in Debrett
- Status: dormant
- Motto: Tenax et fidelis, Firm and faithful
- Arms: or, two chevronnels between three trefoils slipped sable
- Crest: an eagle's head couped proper, beaked azure

The Abdy Baronetcy, of Albyns, in the County of Essex, was created in the Baronetage of the United Kingdom on 22 December 1849 for Thomas Neville Abdy who sat for Lyme Regis in the British House of Commons. It was a second creation for the seat: see Abdy baronets of Albyns (1660).

== Abdy baronets, of Albyns (1849) ==
=== Sir Thomas Neville Abdy, 1st Baronet ===
Sir Thomas Neville Abdy, 1st Baronet (1810–1877) was the son of Anthony Abdy and Grace Rich. His father was the grandson of Thomas Rutherford and great-grandson of Sir William Abdy, 4th Baronet; the Rutherfords adopted the Abdy surname after the failure of the original male line of Abdys. He was educated at St John's College, Cambridge, and after unsuccessfully contesting Maldon in 1841, sat as Member of Parliament for Lyme Regis from 1847 to 1852. In 1849, he was created a baronet, and was High Sheriff of Essex in 1875. Abdy married Harriet Alston in 1841, by whom he had one daughter and four sons; three of his sons succeeded him as baronets.

=== Sir William Abdy, 2nd Baronet ===
Sir William Neville Abdy, 2nd Baronet (18 June 1844 – 9 August 1910) was the eldest son of Sir Thomas Abdy, 1st Baronet. He succeeded his father in 1877. Educated at Merton College, Oxford, he served as a Justice of the Peace for Essex, and was named High Sheriff of the county in 1884. He married three times, but had no children, and was succeeded by his brother Anthony.

=== Sir Anthony Charles Abdy, 3rd Baronet ===
Sir Anthony Charles Sykes Abdy, 3rd Baronet (19 September 1848 – 17 May 1921) was a British soldier, the second son of Sir Thomas Abdy, 1st Baronet. He served in the 2nd Life Guards, rising to the rank of captain, and fought in the 1882 Anglo-Egyptian War. Abdy was a military attaché in Vienna in 1885. He married Hon. Alexandrina Victoria Macdonald, daughter of Godfrey Macdonald, 4th Baron Macdonald and Maria Anne Wyndham, on 11 November 1886. They had three daughters: Grace Lillian (1887–1983), married Henry Butler, 8th Earl of Lanesborough in 1917, Violet (1892–1957), married Hugh Godsal in 1925, and Constance Mary (1895–1981), married Harold Frederic Andorsen in 1941. Upon the death of his elder brother William in 1910 without children, Anthony succeeded to the baronetcy.

=== Sir Henry Abdy, 4th Baronet ===
Sir Henry Beadon Abdy, 4th Baronet (13 July 1853 – 1 December 1921) was the fourth son of Sir Thomas Abdy, 1st Baronet. He married Anna Adele Coronna (d. 21 March 1920) on 22 March 1891, and had two sons by her: William Neville (1895–1911), who predeceased him, and Robert (1896–1976). He succeeded to the baronetcy when his brother Anthony died in May 1921, leaving only daughters, but Sir Henry died that December, and was succeeded by his only surviving son.

=== Sir Robert Abdy, 5th Baronet ===
Sir Robert Henry Edward Abdy, 5th Baronet (11 September 1896 – 17 November 1976) was the second son of Sir Henry Abdy, 4th Baronet. He was educated at Charterhouse School and the Royal Military College, Sandhurst, and subsequently was commissioned as a lieutenant in the 15th/19th The King's Royal Hussars. Abdy married Iya De Gay (formerly Jongejans; 1897-1993) on 23 June 1923, but they were divorced in 1928. Through this marriage, he became the stepfather of actor George Gaynes. Two years later, on 10 February 1930, he married Lady Diana Bridgeman (1907–1967), daughter of the 5th Earl of Bradford. They had one son, Valentine (b. 1937), before being divorced in 1962. Sir Robert's third wife was Jane Noble, whom he married on 5 September 1962 and divorced in 1973. After the divorce Jane continued to look after Robert until his death. Jane, Lady Abdy died in 2015.

=== Sir Valentine Abdy, 6th Baronet ===
Sir Valentine Robert Duff Abdy, 6th Baronet (11 September 1937 – 27 June 2012) was the only son of Sir Robert Abdy, 5th Baronet. Educated at Eton College, he was a European Representative at the Smithsonian Institution, 1983–1995, serving in 1995 as a member of the National Board. He was Special Advisor to the International Fund for the Promotion of Culture, UNESCO in 1991. He was a member of the Organising Committee, Cité de l'Espace, Toulouse from 1999. Sir Valentine married Mathilde Marie Alexe Christianne de la Ferté in 1971, and they had one son, Robert Etienne Eric Abdy, before divorcing in 1982.

Robert Etienne Eric Abdy is the heir of the 6th Baronet. As of 2021 the baronetcy is listed as Vacant on the Official Roll of the Baronetage, meaning he has yet to prove his claim to the title.

== See also ==
- Abdy baronets
