= Eliab Harvey (1716–1769) =

English politician MP for Dulwich

Eliab Harvey (23 May 1716 – 23 October 1769) was an English politician who sat as MP for Dunwich from 1761 till 1768.

He was the second son of William Harvey, who also served as MP and the brother of William Harvey and Edward Harvey.

He was educated at Westminster School in 1724 and Trinity College, Cambridge in 1734. He was admitted to the Inner Temple in 1733 and called to the bar in 1741. He married Mary (née Benyon) on 20 November 1756.
