= Selly Manor =

14th-century building in Birmingham, England

Coordinates: 52.430769°N 1.934261°W

Selly Manor is a timber-framed building in Bournville, that was moved to its current site in 1916 by chocolate manufacturer and philanthropist George Cadbury.

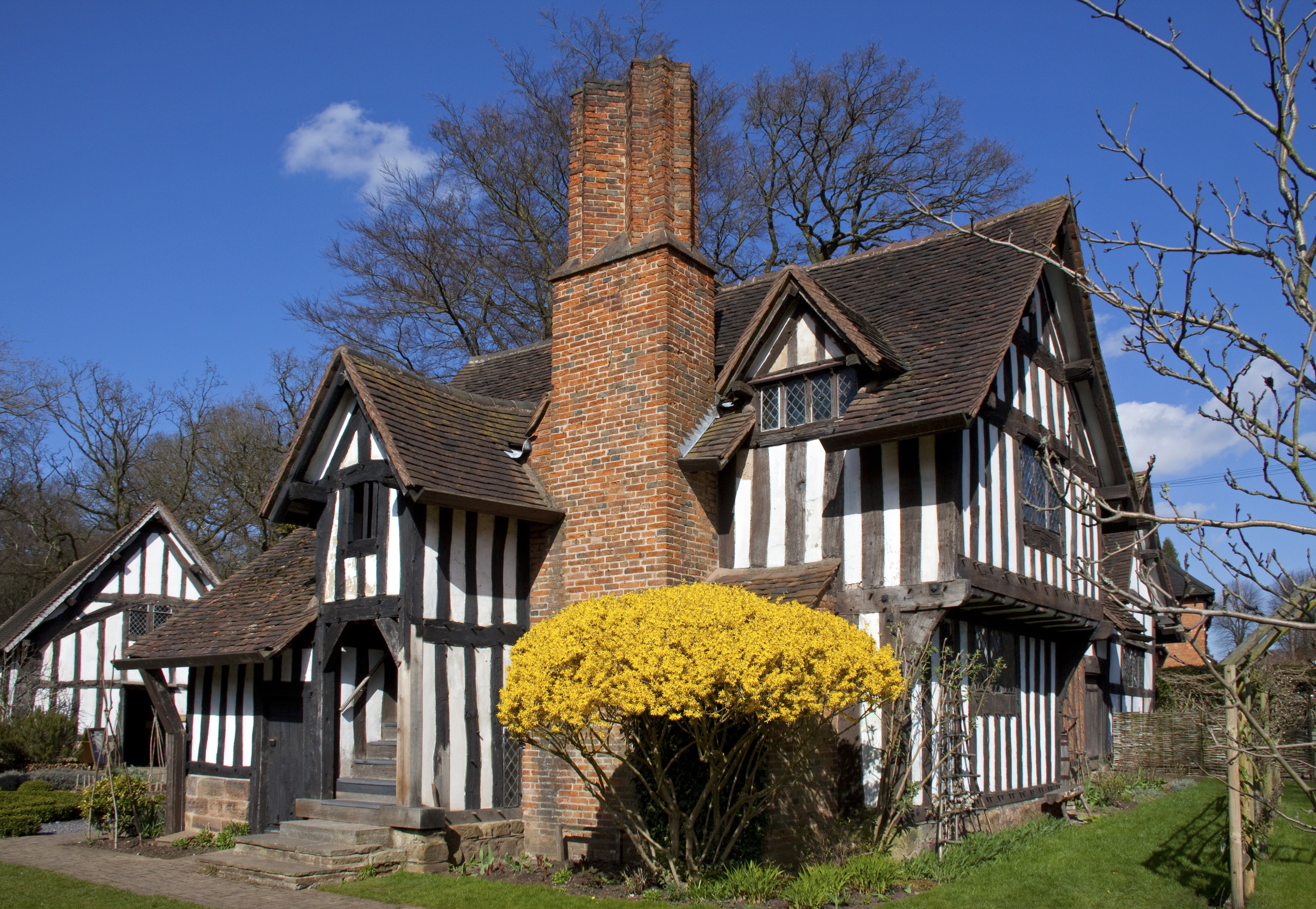
Selly Manor with medieval hall of Minworth Greaves to the left rear of the picture.

Together with the adjacent Minworth Greaves, it is operated as Selly Manor Museum by Bournville Village Trust as a heritage site, community museum and as a venue for functions including weddings, for which it is licensed. The museum is open all year and stages regular events. It houses the Laurence Cadbury furniture Collection of early furniture and domestic objects which date from 1500 – 1900.

== History ==
Over its 500-year history this building has had several names as well as two locations. The earliest records for the house date from 1476. At that time it was called Smythes Tenement and was on land belonging to William Jenette, lord of the sub-manor of Selly. William Jenette leased Smythes Tenement to a local farmer, John Othe’field (John of the field).

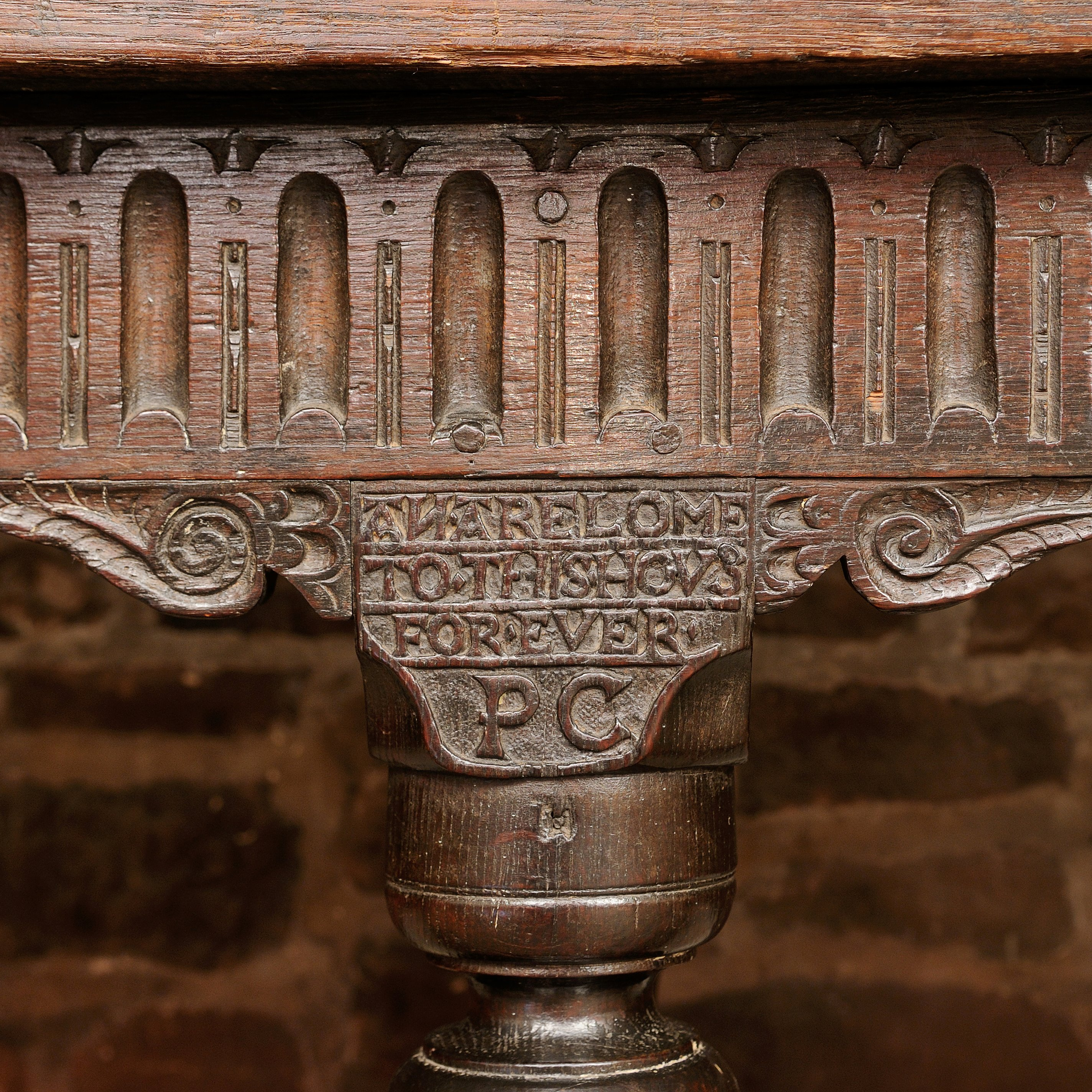
The Crooke Hall table on display at Selly Manor Museum. The carving states 'an arelome to this house forever'.

In 1561, attorney and bailiff John Setterford, his wife Phylis, and her son William Pritchett leased the house. This family is significant as they prospered and bought the house. Phylis Setterford outlived her husband, and when she died in 1608, an inventory of the contents was made, which details the layout of the building as well as every item in it. From this, it is evident that at that time, the middle section of the building was a medieval hall. Hearth tax returns show that this section was replaced by 1664 with the three storey brick section that is now in place. The house was owned and occupied by Phylis Setterford's descendants until 1699. After this date, a succession of absentee landlords failed to invest in the building and its status declined. The house became unfashionable, and its status fell further in 1795 when the house was sold separately to the land that went with it.

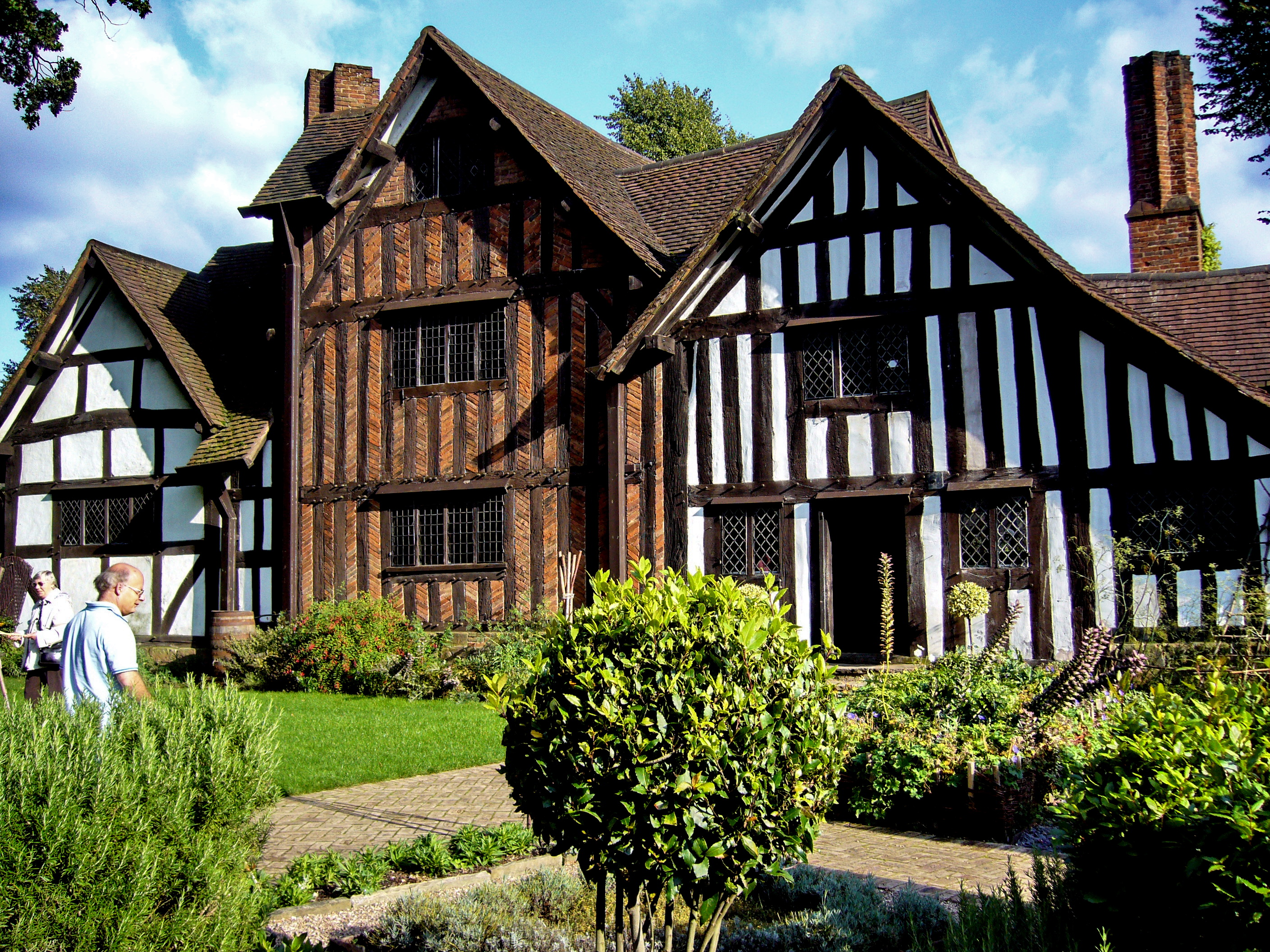
Selly Manor in Bournville, Birmingham.

The condition of Smythes Tenement continued to decline and by 1853 it had been split into three cottages to be leased, and was known as The Rookery. The census records show that by 1861, ten members of the Davis family lived in the smallest end cottage, the middle cottage was occupied by four members of the Thompson family, and the remaining cottage was home to seven members of the Williams family. The house deteriorated further still and following the death of its owner Edward Olivieri, the Rookery was put up for sale by auction in 1907.

== Relocation ==
The building was in a poor state of repair when its destruction was prevented by George Cadbury, who acquired it in 1907 with the intention that it would be a museum to complement the other public buildings he had built in the garden village of Bournville, alongside the Cadbury chocolate factory. In a letter to his son, Laurence wrote These old buildings are educational and especially needed for a new town like Birmingham; a vast majority of people never think of bygone times.

Contemporary accounts state that the area where The Rookery stood was 'unlovely'. To give the building a better future, George Cadbury had the building carefully taken down and moved to its current site. The project was managed by architect William Alexander Harvey, who meticulously documented each step. Work began in 1909, and was finally completed in 1916, at a cost of over £6000. The following year, the building opened as a museum. The house was protected with Grade II listed status in 1952.

In 1932, Minworth Greaves, from Minworth, was similarly relocated, in the manor house's grounds.

== The Laurence Cadbury Collection ==
The museum contains the Laurence Cadbury Collection, a unique collection of furniture and domestic objects intended to give the feel of a house from the 17th century.

Laurence Cadbury was George Cadbury's fourth son, and the collection at Selly Manor is a testament to his interest in collecting fascinating items. Laurence began collecting objects whilst studying at Cambridge in about 1908 and continued well into the mid-1930s. Much of his collection was displayed at his house, The Davids in Northfield, Birmingham, but Selly Manor was a perfect home for the 16th and 17th century furniture and domestic objects he loved so much. From sturdy oak chests and intricate carvings to a beautiful tapestry and unusual utensils, there is so much to appreciate. The highlight of the collection is an 18-foot table dating from the 1630s which was originally from the now demolished Crooke Hall in Lancashire.

A detailed collection catalogue has been produced on the Laurence Cadbury Collection with full descriptions and illustrations.

A collection of Laurence Cadbury's papers, including diaries, letters and maps, are held separately at the Cadbury Research Library, University of Birmingham.
