= William Hervey =

William Hervey may refer to:

- William Hervey, 1st Baron Hervey (died 1642), MP for Horsham, and for Petersfield
- William Hervey (politician, born 1586), MP for Preston, and for Bury St Edmunds
- William Hervey (British Army officer) (1732–1815), MP for Bury St Edmunds 1763–68
- William Hervy (died c. 1400), MP for Gloucestershire

== See also ==
- William Harvey (disambiguation)
