= Harvey Williams =

Harvey Williams may refer to:

- Harvey Williams (American football) (born 1967), former American football running back
- Harvey Williams (musician), English singer, songwriter and guitarist
- Harvey D. Williams (1930–2020), African-American U.S. Army major general
- Harvey Ladew Williams Jr. (1900–1986), American businessman

== See also ==
- Harvey Williams Cushing (1869–1939), American neurosurgeon, pathologist, writer and draftsman
- William Harvey (disambiguation)
