= Sir John Abdy, 4th Baronet =

British politician (c.1714–1759)

Sir John ABDY
- Born: 1714
- Died: 1 April 1759 (aged 44–45)
- Occupation: British baronet

Sir John Abdy, 4th Baronet (c. 1714 – 1 April 1759) was a British baronet and Tory politician.

He was the only surviving son of Sir Robert Abdy, 3rd Baronet and his wife Theodosia Bramstone, only daughter of George Bramstone. Abdy was called to the Bar by the Middle Temple in 1731 and was educated at Trinity College, Oxford, where he matriculated in 1732. He succeeded his father as baronet in 1748, in which year he entered the British House of Commons, sitting as a Tory Member of Parliament (MP) for Essex until his death in 1759. From his father he inherited his country house of Albyns in Essex. He also owned a town house at Lincoln's Inn Fields in London.

Abdy died unmarried in 1759 and was buried in Stapleford Abbotts in Essex. On his death the baronetcy became extinct. His estates, including Albyns, were eventually inherited by his third cousin Sir Anthony Abdy, 5th Baronet.

Parliament of Great Britain
Preceded by William Harvey; Sir Robert Abdy	Member of Parliament for Essex; 1748–1759; With: William Harvey	Succeeded by Sir William Maynard; William Harvey
Baronetage of England
Preceded by Robert Abdy	Baronet (of Albyns); 1748–1759	Extinct
