= Thomas Rutherforth =

English churchman and academic

Thomas Rutherforth (also Rutherford) (1712–1771) was an English churchman and academic, Regius Professor of Divinity at Cambridge from 1745, and Archdeacon of Essex from 1752.

== Life ==
He was the son of Thomas Rutherforth, rector of Papworth Everard, Cambridgeshire, an antiquarian who made collections for a county history. He was born at Papworth St. Agnes, Cambridgeshire, on 3 October 1712, received his education at Huntingdon school under Mr. Matthews, and was admitted a sizar of St John's College, Cambridge, 6 April 1726. He proceeded B.A. in 1729, and commenced M.A. in 1733; he served the office of junior taxor or moderator in the schools in 1736, and graduated B.D. in 1740.

On 28 January 1742 he was elected a member of the Gentlemen's Society at Spalding, and on 27 January 1743 he was elected a Fellow of the Royal Society. He taught physical science privately at Cambridge, and issued in 1743 Ordo Institutionum Physicarum. In 1745 he was appointed Regius Professor of Divinity at Cambridge, and created D.D.

He became chaplain to Frederick, Prince of Wales, and afterwards to the dowager Princess Augusta of Saxe-Gotha. He also became rector of Shenfield, Essex, and was instituted to the rectory of Barley, Hertfordshire, 13 April 1751. On 28 November 1752 he was presented to the archdeaconry of Essex.

He died in the house of his wife's brother, Sir Anthony Abdy, on 5 October 1771, and was buried in the chancel of Barley church; a memorial slab placed over his tomb was removed in 1871 to the west wall of the south aisle.

== Works ==
Rutherforth was "at the heart of Cambridge latitudinarianism". His dissertation for D.D., concerning the sacrifice of Isaac as a type of Christ's death, was published in Latin, and elicited a reply from Joseph Edwards, M.A. Besides sermons, tracts, charges, and a paper read before the Gentlemen's Society at Spalding, on Plutarch's description of the instrument used to renew the Vestal fire, Rutherforth published:

- ‘An Essay on the Nature and Obligations of Virtue,’ Cambridge, 1744. Thomas Chubb attacked this in The Ground and Foundation of Morality Considered (1745). Catherine Cockburn also wrote a confutation, which William Warburton published with a preface of his own as ‘Remarks upon … Dr. Rutherforth's Essay … in Vindication of the contrary Principles and Reasonings inforced in the Writings of the late Dr. Samuel Clarke,’ 1747.
- ‘A System of Natural Philosophy, being a Course of Lectures in Mechanics, Optics, Hydrostatics, and Astronomy,’ 2 vols. Cambridge, 1748.
- ‘A Defence of the Bishop of London's Discourses concerning the use and intent of Prophecy; in a Letter to Dr. Middleton;’ 2nd edit. London, 1750. On behalf of Thomas Sherlock, against Conyers Middleton.
- ‘The Credibility of Miracles defended against the Author of Philosophical Essays,’ Cambridge, 1751. Against David Hume.
- ‘Institutes of Natural Law; being the substance of a Course of Lectures on Grotius de Jure Belli et Pacis,’ 2 vols. Cambridge, 1754–6, 8vo; second American edition, revised, Baltimore, 1832.
- ‘A Letter to … Mr. Kennicott, in which his Defence of the Samaritan Pentateuch is examined, and his second Dissertation on the State of the printed Hebrew Text of the Old Testament is shewn to be in many instances Injudicious and Inaccurate,’ Cambridge, 1761. Benjamin Kennicott published in 1762 an answer, to which Rutherforth retorted in ‘A Second Letter.’
- ‘A Vindication of the Right of Protestant Churches to require the Clergy to subscribe to an established Confession of Faith and Doctrines, in a Charge delivered at a Visitation in July 1766,’ Cambridge [1766]. ‘An Examination’ of this charge ‘by a Clergyman of the Church of England’ (Benjamin Dawson) reached a fifth edition in 1767.
- ‘A Second Vindication of the Right of Protestant Churches,’ &c., Cambridge, 1766. This was also answered anonymously by Dawson.
- ‘A Defence of a Charge concerning Subscriptions, in a Letter to the Author of the Confessional,’ Cambridge, 1767. Against Francis Blackburne, this caused further controversy.

== Family ==
He married Charlotte Elizabeth, daughter of Sir William Abdy, 4th Baronet, and left one son, Thomas Abdy Rutherforth, who became rector of Theydon Garnon, Essex, and died on 14 October 1798.
