= Jane, Lady Abdy =

English art dealer (1934–2015)

- Born: Jane Noble; 24 May 1934; Leicester, England
- Died: 22 December 2015 (aged 81); Pelham Place, London, England
- Education: Somerville College, Oxford
- Occupations: Art dealer and socialite
- Spouse: Sir Robert Abdy, 5th Baronet (m. 1962; div. 1972)

Jane, Lady Abdy (born Jane Noble) (24 May 1934 – 22 December 2015) was an English socialite and art dealer. She has been described as one of the most original and respected art dealers of her generation and opened British eyes to 19th-century French art. She is also credited for introducing many now revered 19th-century Danish artists to the international market.

== Early life ==
She was born on 24 May 1934 in Leicester, the daughter of John Henry Noble and his wife, Grace, of 119 Loughborough Road. She was educated at Wycombe Abbey in High Wycombe, Buckinghamshire. At Wycombe Abbey she became friends with the Shand sisters – Elspeth, later Baroness Howe of Idlicote, and Mary, who later married the architect James Stirling. Lady Abdy later went up to Somerville College, Oxford, where she read English and graduated in 1955.

After her graduation from Somerville, she went to work in London as an assistant selling Old Master paintings. It was there where she met Sir Robert "Bertie" Abdy, 5th baronet, an art dealer whose vast fortune derived from the family's ownership of large parts of the Port of London. They married on 5 September 1962 when she was 28 and he was 66. Earlier that year, he had divorced his second wife, Lady Diana Bridgeman, who had suffered brain damage after a car crash in 1956. The couple lived in a duplex flat at 55 Eaton Square and at Newton Ferrers, a 17th-century country house in St Mellion, Cornwall, that Abdy had acquired in 1936 and then renovated in the Art Deco taste.

== Career ==
Lady Abdy was a bluestocking and read voraciously in French and English. Her friends included Cecil Beaton, Kenneth Clark and Diana Mitford. Hugo Vickers a writer, broadcaster and close friend of Lady Abdy, notes that she was particularly keen on the Belle Époque:

If Jane might have preferred to live in the Belle Epoque rather than the late 20th century, this would have been of no concern to her, since she chose her homes, her pictures, her clothes, her jewellery and her friends with equal care.

— Hugo Vickers, 2016

She staged exhibitions from the late 1960s through the 1970s with her husband at the tiny Ferrers Gallery in Piccadilly Arcade. During those years she was especially interested in the paintings and prints of James Tissot and Paul César Helleu. She was one of the first art dealers in modern times to appreciate the portraits of Jacques-Émile Blanche and Giovanni Boldini and also promoted the cat studies by Théophile Steinlen and innovative colour posters of Jules Chéret. With the help of Jeremy Maas and Christopher Wood, she was responsible for the modern revival of interest in the painter John Atkinson Grimshaw. The Abdys divorced in 1972, but she continued to look after him until his death in 1976.

At the end of the 1970s, in partnership with Anne Heseltine, Lady Abdy formed the Bury Street Gallery in St James's. She entertained in her terraced house opposite Noël Coward's in Gerald Road, Belgravia, where her drawing room was dominated by Winterhalter’s near life-size portrait of Princess Alexandra of Saxe-Altenburg. Around this time her friend James Reeve painted a full-length portrait of Lady Abdy in the Mexican jungle. In the 1980s Heseltine left the gallery and Lady Abdy turned her attention to 19th-century Danish paintings and prints. She exhibited works by Vilhelm Hammershøi, Christen Købke and Peter Ilsted. She also worked as a bidding agent for a member of the Saudi royal family.

As well as producing exhibition catalogues, Lady Abdy co-authored The Souls (1984, with Charlotte Gere) which profiled the members of the late-19th century elite social group of that name.

== Later life ==
In 1990 she moved to 8 Pelham Place where she stayed for the rest of her life. 8 Pelham Place is famous as the London home of her friend Cecil Beaton from 1940 to 1975, where in 1967 he photographed the model Twiggy wearing a yellow velvet dress for an editorial for Vogue.

Jane died at the age of 81, on 22 December 2015, at her home in Pelham Place. Her collection of art went on sale by Sotheby's in an online auction, called La Belle Epoque: 19th & 20th Century Pictures. A remembrance by the writer Hugo Vickers calls her "Belle of the London Art World".
