= Sir Robert Abdy, 3rd Baronet =

British politician (1688–1748)

Sir Robert Abdy, 3rd Baronet FSA (8 April 1688 – 27 August 1748), of Albyns, Essex, was a British Tory politician who sat in the House of Commons from 1727 to 1748.

Abdy was the only son of Sir John Abdy, 2nd Baronet and his wife, Jane Nicholas, the daughter of Sir Edward Nicholas. In 1691, aged only three, he succeeded his father as baronet. Abdy matriculated at Trinity College, Oxford, on 4 August 1705. On 5 July 1711, he married Theodosia Bramstone, only daughter of George Bramstone at St Christopher le Stocks in London.

At the 1727 British general election Abdy was returned unopposed as Tory member of parliament (MP) for Essex. He voted against the Administration in all known divisions. He was returned in a contest at the 1734 British general election and was unopposed at the 1741 British general election. He was a Jacobite and was to have been one of the leaders of the 1744 Jacobite rising in Essex, and was privy to the military details of the planned French invasion. He was returned unopposed for Essex at the 1747 general election. Abdy was further a Fellow of the Society of Antiquaries of London (FSA).

Abdy died on 27 August 1748 aged 60 and was buried in Stapleford Abbotts in Essex. He and his wife had two sons and two daughters. He was succeeded in the baronetcy by his eldest son John.

Abdy had a private library of some significance, and books with his bookplate can still be found in libraries today.

Parliament of Great Britain
Preceded by Robert Honywood; William Harvey	Member of Parliament for Essex; 1727–1748; With: The Viscount Castlemaine 1727–1734; Thomas Bramston 1727–1747; William Harvey 1747–1748	Succeeded by William Harvey; Sir John Abdy, Bt
Baronetage of England
Preceded by John Abdy	Baronet (of Albyns); 1691–1748	Succeeded by John Abdy
