= Weoley Hill United Reformed Church =

Weoley Hill United Reformed Church, Birmingham
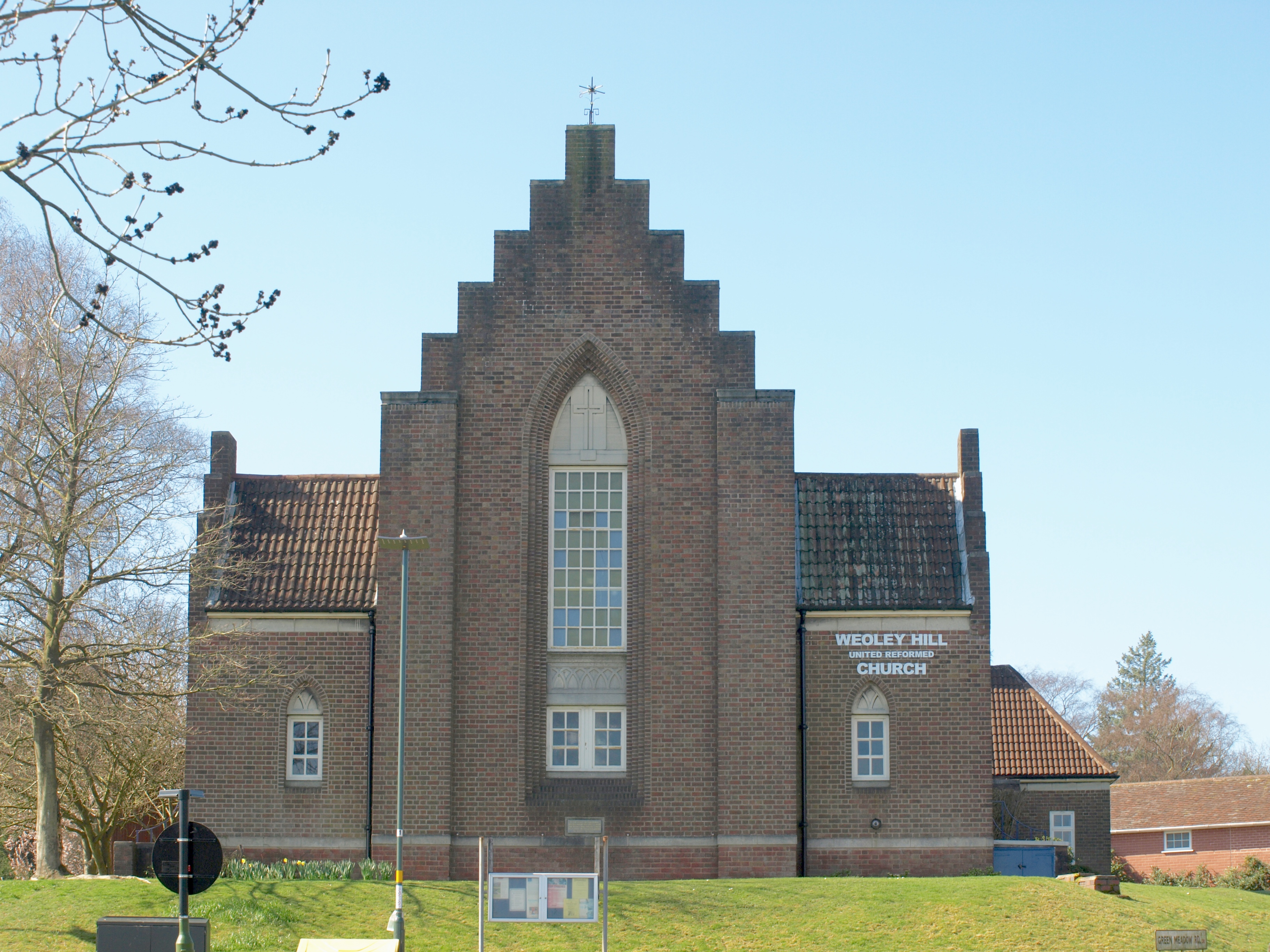
- Weoley Hill United Reformed Church, Birmingham
- 52.4329°N 1.9573°W
- Denomination: United Reformed
- Website: www.weoleyhillchurch.org.uk

Weoley Hill United Reformed Church is at the junction of Bryony Road and Green Meadow Road in Birmingham. It is notable architecturally for its unusual Scottish gable. Other sources refer to it as a Danish-style gable.

== History ==
The church was opened on 1 July 1933. It was built to designs by the architect J.R. Armstrong (architect to the Bournville Village Trust). The church cost £600 (equivalent to £37,127 in 2025).

Initially it was a Presbyterian Chapel, but became a United Reformed Church in the union of the Presbyterian Church of England and the Congregational Church in England and Wales in 1972.

== Organ ==
The organ was built by Conacher of Sheffield. A specification of the organ can be found on the National Pipe Organ Register.
