= Elizabeth Tylden =

Psychiatrist

- Born: 1 August 1917; Appledore, Orange Free State, South Africa
- Died: 3 February 2009 (aged 91); Kent, England, United Kingdom
- Other names: Betty Tylden
- Education: Medical degree
- Alma mater: Girton College, Cambridge
- Occupation: Forensic psychiatrist
- Employer(s): Bromley Hospital, University College Hospital, Middlesex Hospital Medical School
- Known for: Work on cults, trauma, child abuse
- Spouse: George Morgan
- Children: Tom and Sarah Morgan
- Parent(s): Major Geoffrey Tylden and Cicely Abdy

Elizabeth Tylden (1 August 1917 – 3 February 2009) was a British psychiatrist who specialized in working with adult survivors of child abuse, and those affected by religious cults and the use of mind control techniques. She became known as a forensic psychiatrist who acted as an expert witness in many such cases from 1948 until her retirement in 2004.

== Early life ==
Tylden was the daughter of Major Geoffrey Tylden, the military historian, and Cicely Abdy, daughter of Brigadier-General Anthony John Abdy. She was born and raised in Appledore in the Orange Free State, South Africa, where her father was given land after the Boer War, but moved to England for her education. She attended Godolphin School, Salisbury, and studied medicine at Girton College, Cambridge.

== Career ==
=== Interest in trauma and cult membership ===
According to The Daily Telegraph, she first became interested in mental trauma when she worked as a registrar in London during the Second World War under the psychiatrist William Sargant. She worked with soldiers who were suffering from what was then known as "battle exhaustion," and people affected by The Blitz, the bombing of British cities by the German airforce. From the 1980s onwards, she worked with former members of cults, including the Children of God and the International Church of Christ. She was often called as an expert witnesses in cases involving cults, and their exercise of what lawyers call "undue influence" over the membership using mind-control techniques. Some of these techniques sought to exercise what Tylden called totalitarian control over the members, leading to mental illness which sometimes involved delusions and hallucinations that led to a diagnosis of schizophrenia. Tylden argued that these patients were not psychotic, but were engaged in normal "survival reactions" to trauma. Psychologists now call such a response complex post-traumatic stress disorder (C-PTSD). Tylden argued that psychoanalysis and conventional psychotherapy, which seek causes in childhood, were inappropriate as treatment in such cases, and that relaxation therapy or hypnotic regression might return the patients to the mental state they were in the cult, with its group singing, meditation, or other "group thought-reform patterns of behaviour," as the Telegraph puts it.

=== Child and family psychiatry ===
She became a child and family psychiatrist at Bromley Hospital in 1949, and a consultant in 1960. She also worked part-time at University College Hospital, establishing England's first drug abuse clinic. She was involved in drafting the Guidelines of Good Clinical Practice in the Treatment of Drug Misuse published in 1984 by the Department of Health.

=== St Julian's ===
Tylden married George Douglas Morgan, also a psychiatrist, on 30 November 1944, and together with other professional couples they bought St Julians in 1951, a large country house near Sevenoaks, Kent— established as a private members' club in 1956—where they created an experimental communal household in which families, including professional women, could live and work while having their children looked after in the house's nursery.

Other founder members included Henry Cornelius and John Arnold, film directors and producers, and Ian Gibson-Smith, film producer and writer. Subsequent residents included Rowland Hilder, artist and Mai Zetterling, actress.
