= Shenley Green =

Coordinates: 52°25′36″N 1°58′27″W

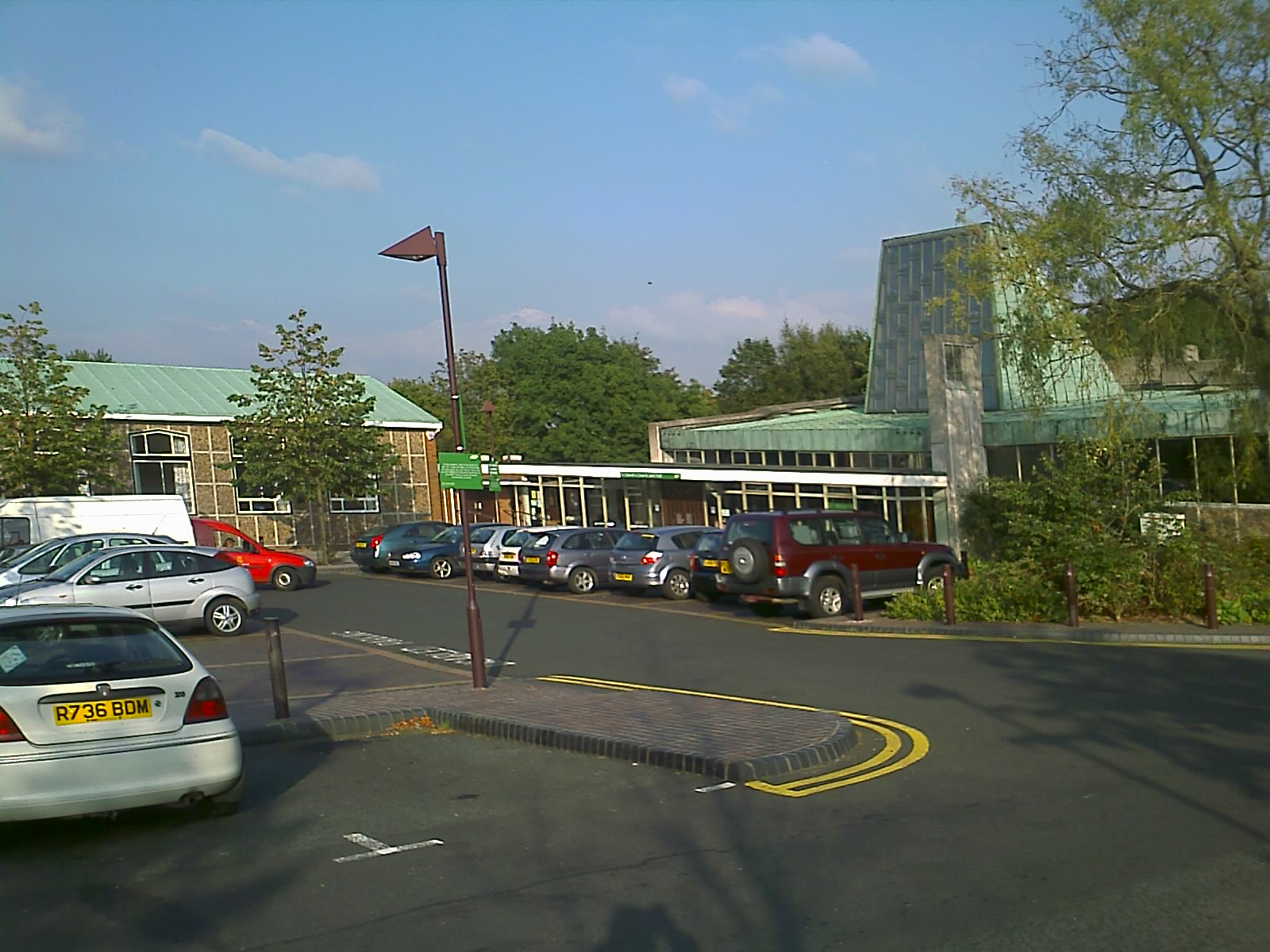
St. David's Church, Shenley Green

Shenley Green is an area of Birmingham. It is located in the south-west of the city, between Weoley Castle and Northfield.

Shenley Green was a post war development built on the location of Shendley Green Farm and by 1958 there were around 8,000 residents.

The centre of Shenley Green comprises a shopping area, the Shenley Centre and St. David's Church. It is part of Bournville Village Trust.

The Shenley Green Centre was conceived by local people and built in 1965 as a youth club. St. David's Church was opened in 1970 and its prominent feature is the large lantern tower. The former church building became the community hall for the new church.
