= Pelham Place, London =

Street in South Kensington, London

Coordinates: 51.4933°N 0.1717°W

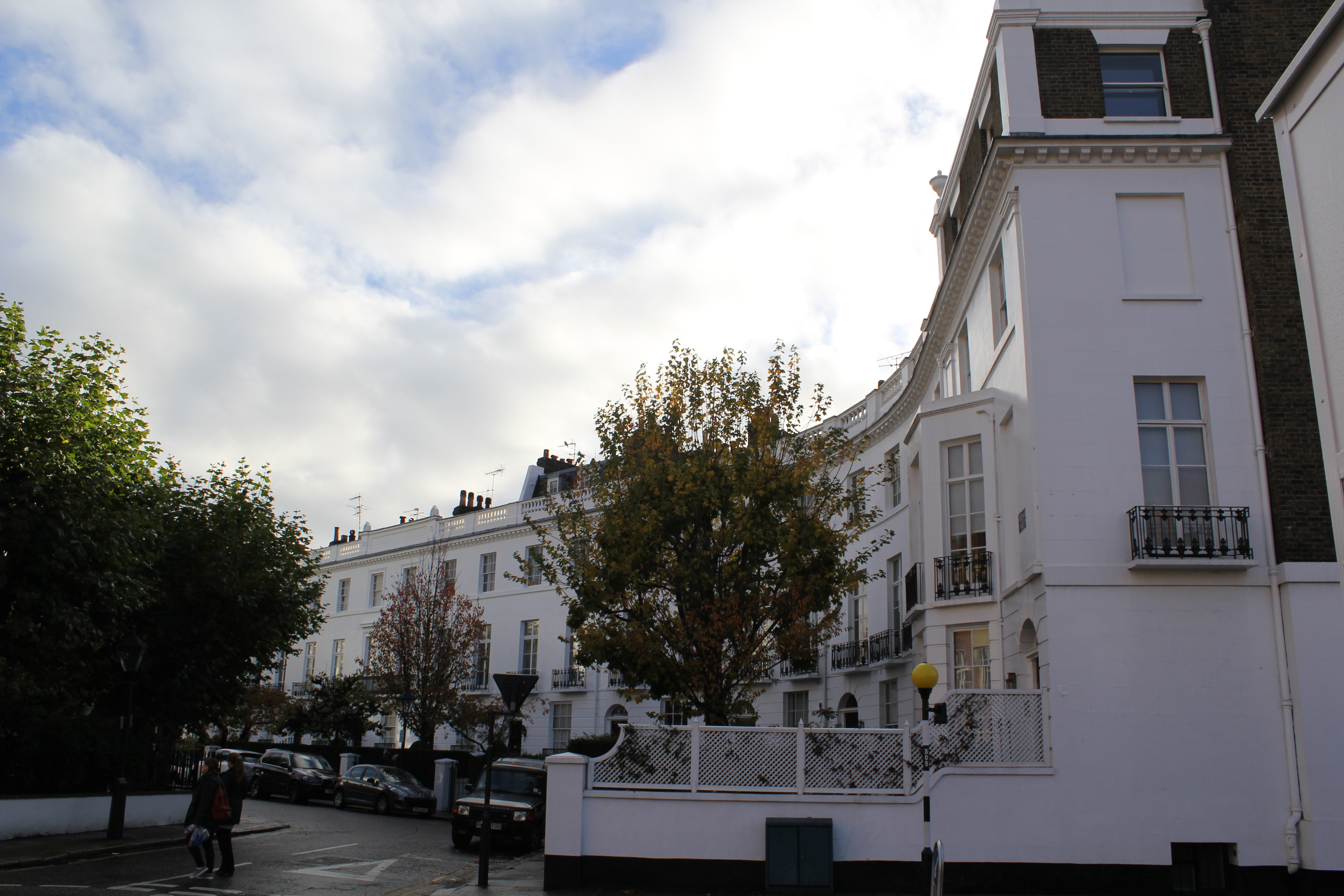
Pelham Place, London SW7

Pelham Place is a street of Grade II* listed Georgian terraced houses in South Kensington, London, England.

Pelham Place runs north to south from Pelham Place to Pelham Crescent.

2-14 is a circa 1825 terrace. 1-29 is an 1833 terrace, designed by the architect George Basevi. 1-29 is similarly grade II listed.

In 1950, the British-born American winemaker Peter Newton met his future wife, Anne St. Aubyn at a party in his house in Pelham Place.

Mel Brooks briefly lived in Pelham Place in the 1950s, while working at the BBC on the Sid Caesar show.

In 1967, Cecil Beaton photographed the model Twiggy wearing a yellow velvet dress by John Bates for Jean Varon in the residence of 8 Pelham Place, for an editorial for Vogue. Beaton lived here from 1940 to 1975. This was later the home of Jane, Lady Abdy.
