= John Poole (sculptor) =

British freelance sculptor

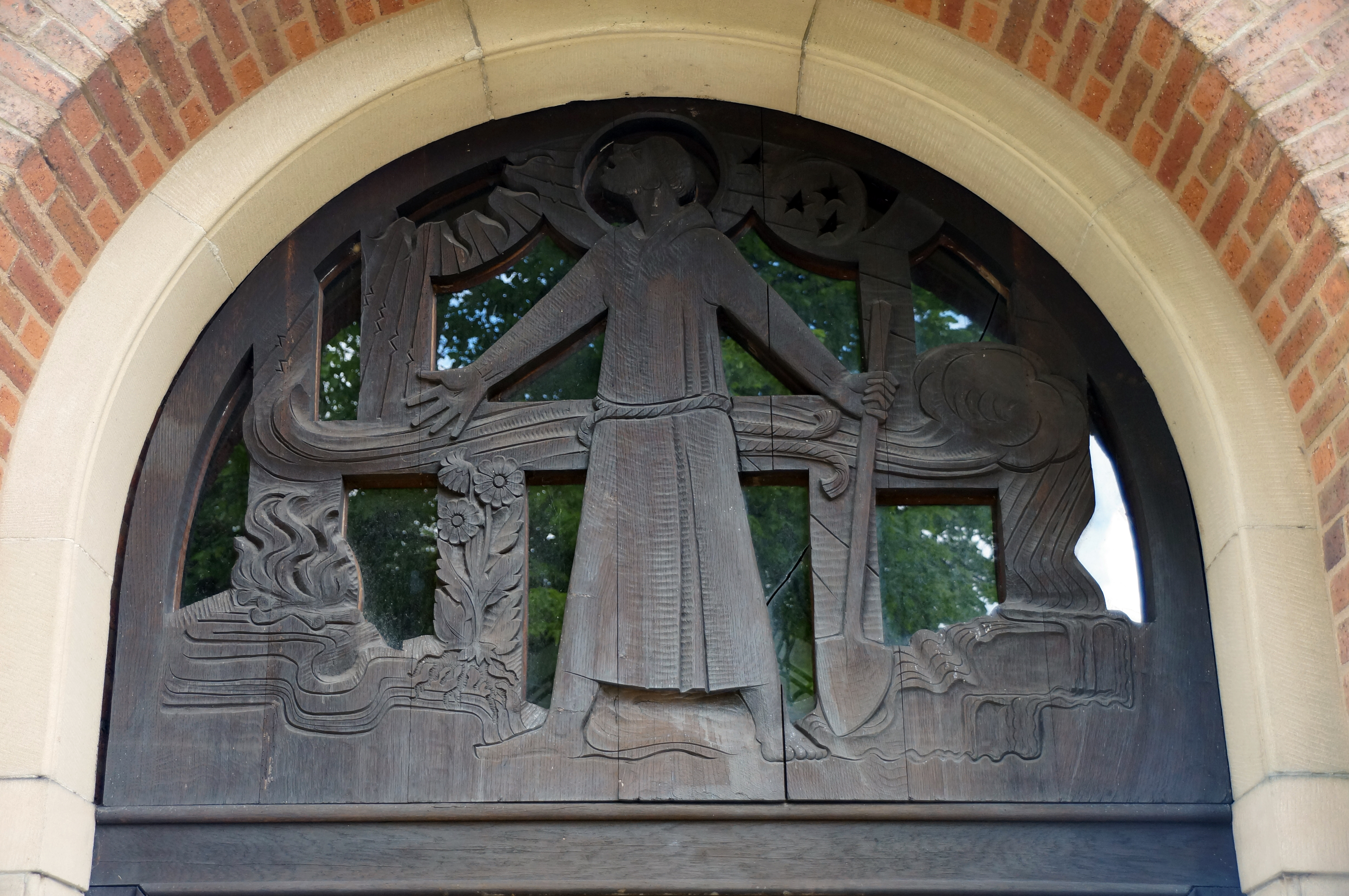
Carved wooden tympanum at St Francis Church, Bournville

Anthony John John Poole, FRBS, Hon. FRBSA, (born Handsworth, Birmingham, 17 December 1926 – died Bishampton, Worcestershire, 2 September 2009) was a British freelance sculptor and winner of 2 Otto Beit medals.

== Early life ==
Poole grew up in Hall Green, Birmingham, attending Hall Green Infants and Junior School, Stratford Road. At the age of 12 he gained a place at Moseley Road Junior School of Art, and went on to study Industrial Design at the Birmingham School of Art. At the age of 17, in the Studio of William Bloye, he learnt the art of letter carving in the style of Eric Gill. In December 1944, Poole was called up for service in the Coldstream Guards and the Parachute Regiment during World War II. As a lieutenant he served in France and in Germany as a liaison officer during the Nuremberg trials. He was subsequently recruited as an officer in the Parachute Regiment 7th (Light Infantry) Parachute Battalion, serving in Egypt and Palestine.

== Works ==
His first major commission was "The Sower", an heroic-size figure, carved out of Belgian granite in 1959, for Cannock Library in Staffordshire.

Thirty of his major commissions were in and around Birmingham, his most notable being "The Rotunda Relief" at Lloyds Bank (1963). A 1,500-square-foot (140 m^{2}) ciment fondu mural for the Lloyds Banking Hall in the newly built Rotunda in Birmingham, which was subsequently Grade II listed by English Heritage. However, since that building was renovated, it has been hidden from view, with only a small part visible, on the top floor of a retail unit.

Birmingham Cathedral has a font and cover in bronze, as well as memorials to Ambrose Brown and Dr William Small of the Lunar Society, all by Poole.

He was associated with the Cadbury family, particularly Sir Adrian Cadbury and with the Church of St Francis of Assisi in Bournville, where his tympanum, "The Canticle to the Sun", font, aumbrey, sanctuary lights, and Cadbury memorials can be seen.

In 1969 he won the Otto Beit medal for Sculpture for his "Risen Christ" at St. Dunstan's Church, King's Heath and then again in 1974 for his "Last Supper" carving on the Altar and Ambo in St. Helen's Cathedral in Brentwood, Essex. He is the only sculptor to have received two Otto Beit medals.
