= Abdy baronets of Albyns (1660) =

Extinct baronetcy in the Baronetage of England

Abdy baronets
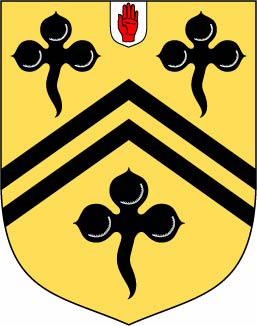
- Escutcheon of the Abdy baronets of Albyns
- Creation date: 1660
- Status: extinct
- Extinction date: 1759
- Arms: or, two chevronels between three trefoils slipped, sable

The Abdy baronetcy, of Albyns, in the County of Essex (first creation), was created in the Baronetage of England on 9 June 1660 for Robert Abdy. It became extinct on the death in 1759 of the 4th baronet.

== Abdy baronets, of Albyns, Essex (first creation) ==
=== Sir Robert Abdy, 1st Baronet ===
Sir Robert Abdy, 1st Baronet (c. 1615–1670) was the second son of Anthony Abdy, alderman of London, and younger brother of Sir Thomas Abdy, 1st Baronet. He married Catherine (d. 6 September 1662), the daughter of Sir John Gayer. He was knighted on 6 June 1660 and was created a baronet a few days later, on 9 June. He had several sons and daughters, including John (1643–1691), and Catherine Abdy, who married John Pennington. He was a book collector and passed his collection to his eldest son John. Sir Robert died in 1670 and was buried at Stapleford Abbotts.

=== Sir John Abdy, 2nd Baronet ===
Sir John Abdy, 2nd Baronet (1643–1691) was the eldest son of the 1st Baronet, whom he succeeded in 1670. He married Jane Nicholas (died 1721), the granddaughter of Sir Edward Nicholas, on 10 May 1687 in Westminster Abbey. By her he left a son, Robert (1688–1748), who succeeded him, and a daughter, Jane, who married Rev. Edward Cranke. Sir John died in 1691 and was buried at Stapleford Abbotts.

=== Sir Robert Abdy, 3rd Baronet ===
Sir Robert Abdy, 3rd Baronet, FSA (1688–1748), English Jacobite and antiquary, was the only son of the 2nd Baronet. He succeeded to the baronetcy as a child in 1691. A zealous Tory, he sat as Member of Parliament for Essex from 1727 until his death. He was a confidant of the Young Pretender and was privy to the plans for the abortive French invasion of 1744, which was intended to support a Jacobite rising in Essex. He died in 1748 and was succeeded by his eldest son, John.

=== Sir John Abdy, 4th Baronet ===
Sir John Abdy, 4th Baronet (c. 1714–1759) was the eldest son of the 3rd Baronet. Educated at the Middle Temple and Trinity College, Oxford, he succeeded his father in the baronetcy and as Member of Parliament for Essex in 1748 and sat as a Tory until his death, unmarried, in 1759. He left his estates to his third cousin, Sir Anthony Abdy, 5th Baronet.

== See also ==
- Abdy baronets
