= William Harvey (1689–1742) =

English politician

Member of Parliament
- In office 1710–1713
- Constituency: Old Sarum

Personal details
- Born: 20 April 1689
- Died: 24 December 1742 (aged 53)
- Children: 5, including William Harvey, Eliab Harvey, and Edward Harvey
- Parent: William Harvey (father)
- Education: Christ Church, Oxford

William Harvey II (20 April 1689 – 24 December 1742) was an English politician who sat as MP for Old Sarum from 1710 till 1713.

He was the first son of William Harvey. He was educated at Christ Church, Oxford in 1705. He married Mary, the daughter of Ralph Williamson c. 1714 and had three sons (William, Eliab and Edward) and two daughters, one daughter predeceased him.
