= Robert Abdy (cricketer) =

English Royal Navy officer and cricketer (1860–1899)

Personal information
- Full name: Robert Burlton Abdy
- Born: 19 May 1860; Hornsey, Middlesex, England
- Died: 21 May 1899 (aged 39); Great Yarmouth, Norfolk, England
- Batting: Unknown
- Relatives: Anthony Abdy (brother)

Domestic team information
- Years: Team
- 1888: Marylebone Cricket Club

Career statistics
Competition	First-class
Matches	2
Runs scored	8
Batting average	2.00
100s/50s	–/–
Top score	6
Balls bowled	–
Wickets	–
Bowling average	–
5 wickets in innings	–
10 wickets in match	–
Best bowling	–
Catches/stumpings	1/–
- Source: Cricinfo, 5 October 2018

Robert Burlton Abdy (19 May 1860 – 21 May 1899) was an English first-class cricketer and Royal Navy officer.

Abdy was born at Hornsey in May 1860 to Marion Hollway and her husband, John Thomas Abdy. He entered into HMS Britannia in July 1873. He entered service with the Royal Navy in 1875, with the rank of Midshipman, becoming a sub lieutenant in August 1882. He played two first-class cricket matches for the Marylebone Cricket Club at Lord's in 1882. Abdy was placed on the retired naval list in February 1899, and died three months later in May. His brother, Anthony, was also a first-class cricketer.
