= Lady Diana Bridgeman =

English socialite and fashion leader (1907–1967)

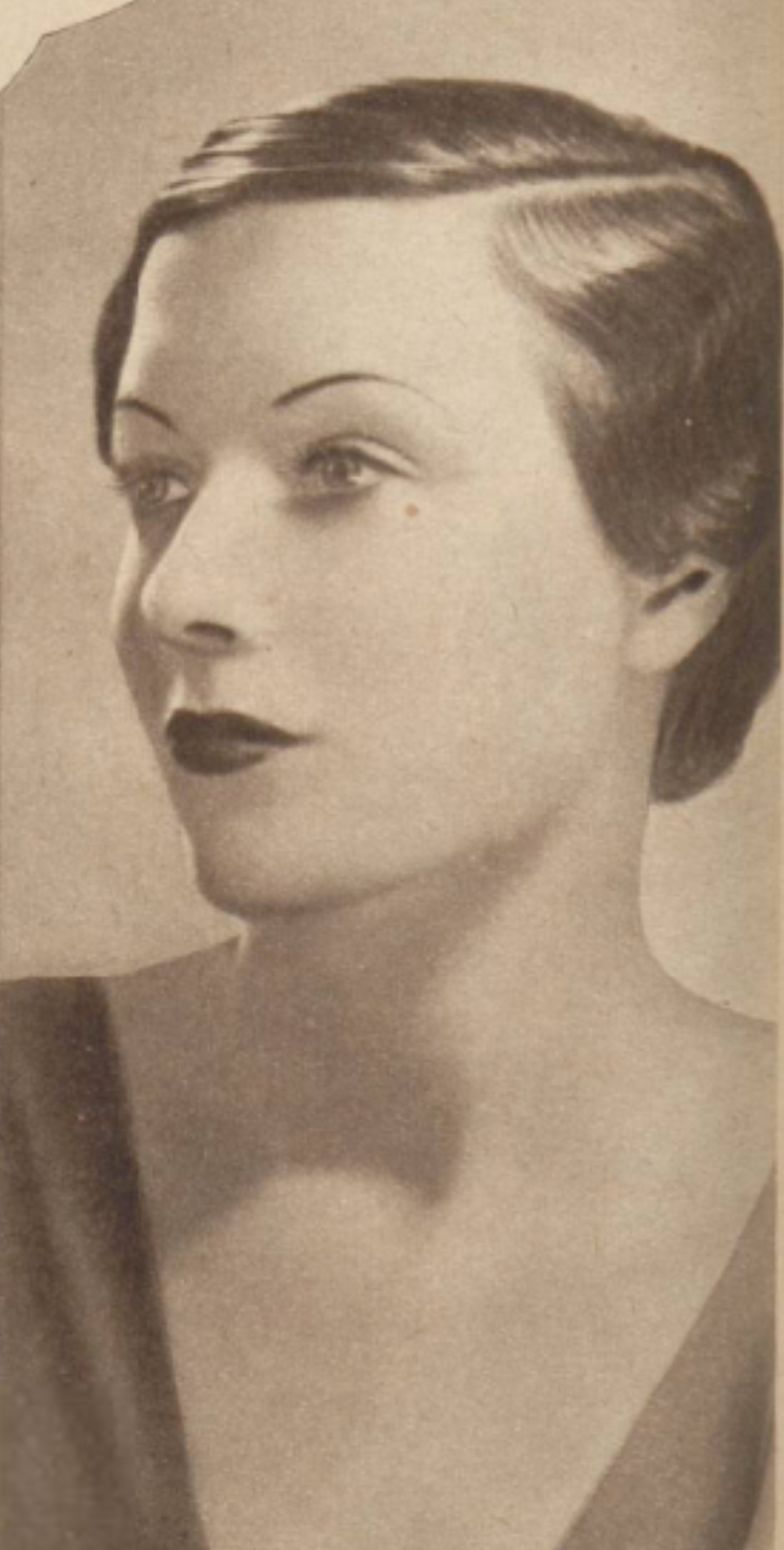
Lady Diana Abdy, c. 1931

Lady Helen Diana Abdy (née Bridgeman; 22 June 1907 – 7 May 1967) was an English socialite and fashion leader.

== Biography ==
Lady Helen Diana Bridgeman was born on 22 June 1907, the daughter of Orlando Bridgeman, 5th Earl of Bradford, and the Hon. Margaret Cecilia Bruce.

Lady Diana Bridgeman was also an artist; in 1920 publisher Erskine MacDonald published The Poems & Paintings of the Lady Diana Bridgeman. Her portrait posing as a painter by Harold Speed is at the Leamington Spa Gallery and Museum.

In 1922 she was the youngest bridesmaid at the wedding of Mary, Princess Royal and Countess of Harewood, daughter of George V.

In May 1923, a month short of her 19th birthday, she was introduced to the American socialite and anglophile Henry 'Chips' Channon. They met many times thereafter until her marriage. Although bisexual himself he was fascinated by her and wondered repeatedly whether to marry her. She designed the cover for his novel.

On 10 February 1930 she married Sir Robert Henry Edward Abdy, 5th Baronet, son of Sir Henry Beadon Abdy, 4th Bt. and Anna Adele Coronna. They had one son, Sir Valentine Robert Duff Abdy, 6th Baronet (1937–2012) and divorced in 1962. Sir Robert Abdy was an art authority who owned antique shops in London and Paris.

She died on 7 May 1967, aged 59.
