= William Edwin Harvey (United States Army officer) =

American lawyer and army officer (1871–1922)

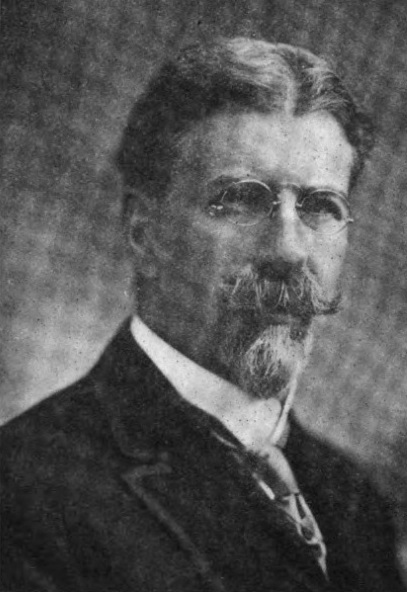
- Harvey in 1915 (Arms and the Man magazine)
- Born: August 6, 1871; Kirkwood, Missouri
- Died: January 13, 1922 (aged 50); Washington, D.C.
- Burial place: Arlington National Cemetery
- Alma mater: George Washington University Law School
- Spouse: Katherine E. Heydrick
- Military career
- Allegiance: United States
- Branch: United States Army
- Service years: 1890–1918
- Rank: Brigadier general
- Commands: District of Columbia National Guard
- Other work: Attorney

William Edwin Harvey (August 6, 1871 – January 13, 1922) was a lawyer and U.S. Army officer in the late 19th and early 20th centuries. He lived in the Washington, D.C., area for much of his life.

== Biography ==
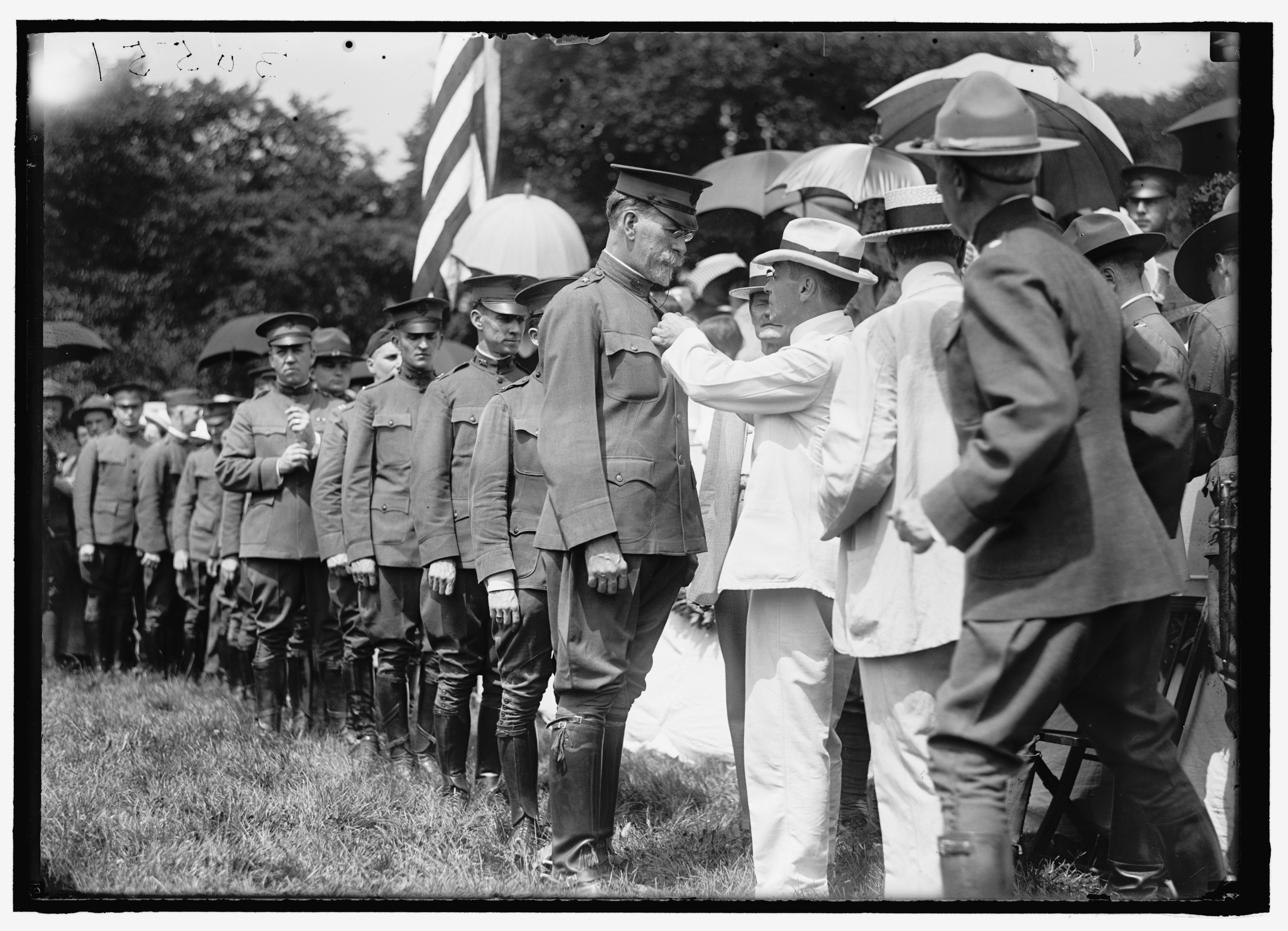
Harvey being decorated

Harvey was born on August 6, 1871, in Kirkwood, Missouri. He received an LL.B. from Columbian University (now George Washington University Law School) in 1893 and an LL.M. from Columbian in 1894. A lawyer, Harvey practiced in Washington, D.C., and was a member of King and King and Associates from 1893 to 1919.

Harney joined the District of Columbia National Guard in 1890 and rose through the ranks. On June 4, 1915, he was appointed as the brigadier general in command of the district militia. He became a brigadier general (NA) on August 22, 1917, and assumed command over the 75th Infantry Brigade at Camp Shelby. He was then transferred and became the commanding general of the First Provisional Brigade Army Troops. Harvey was honorably discharged on May 9, 1918.

Harvey lived in the D.C. neighborhood of Chevy Chase until his death on January 13, 1922. He was buried at Arlington National Cemetery.

== Personal life ==
Harvey married Katherine E. Heydrick on February 12, 1896. He was an Episcopalian.
