= William Harvey (1714–1763) =

English politician

William Harvey (9 June 1714 – 11 June 1763) was a British Tory politician who sat as MP for Essex from 1747 until his death.

He was the firstborn son of William Harvey and the brother of Edward Harvey and Eliab Harvey. He married Emma, the daughter of Stephen Skynner on 13 August 1750. His sons, also William Harvey and Eliab Harvey, similarly became an MP for Essex.
