= William Alexander Harvey =

English architect (1874–1951)

- Born: 11 April 1874; Birmingham, England
- Died: 6 February 1951 (aged 76); Edgbaston, Birmingham
- Education: Birmingham Municipal School of Art
- Occupation: Architect
- Known for: Contributions to the Bournville model village
- Spouse: Lillian Herrmann Morgan (m. 1909; died 1943)

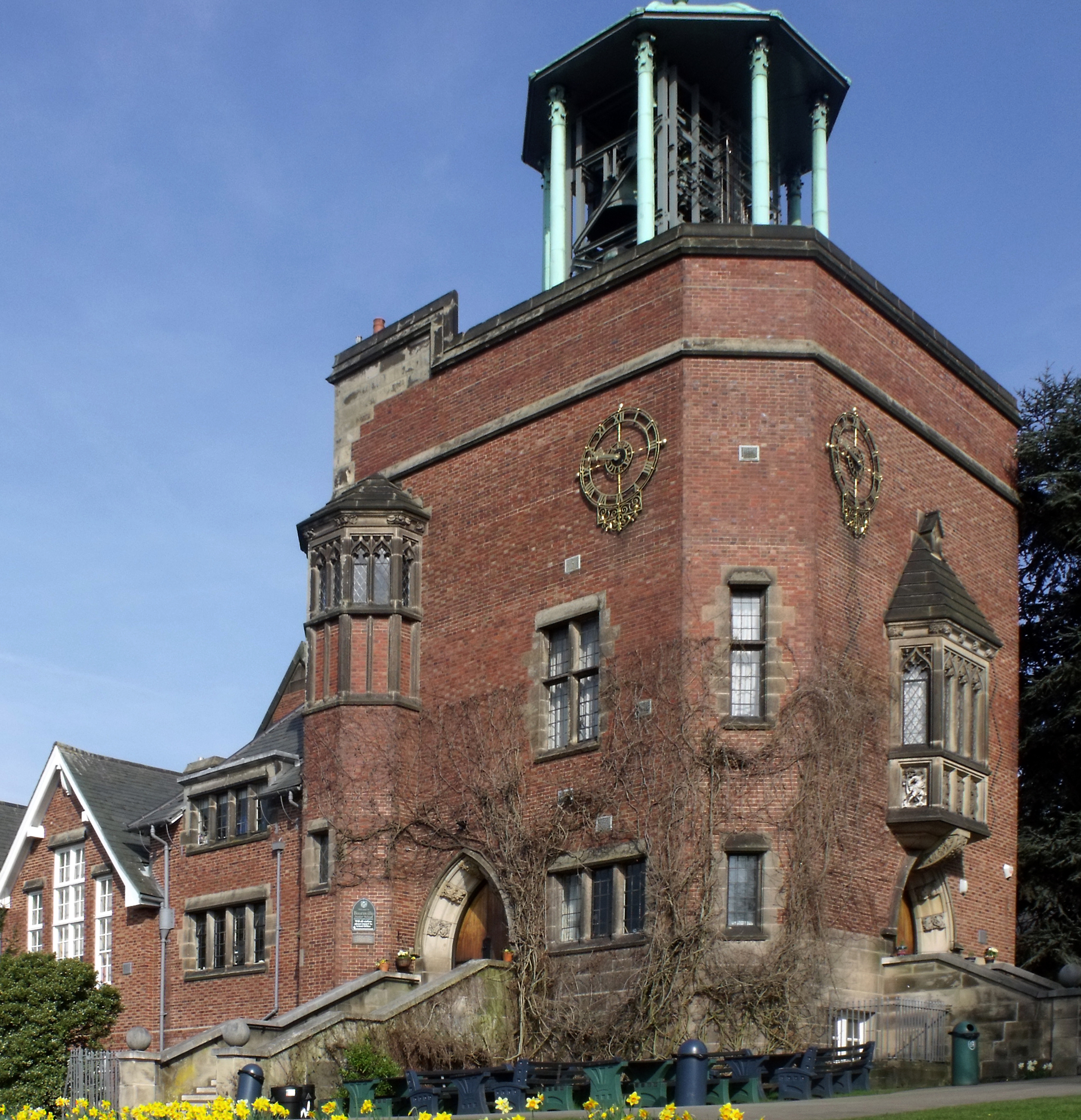
Bournville Junior School, 1905

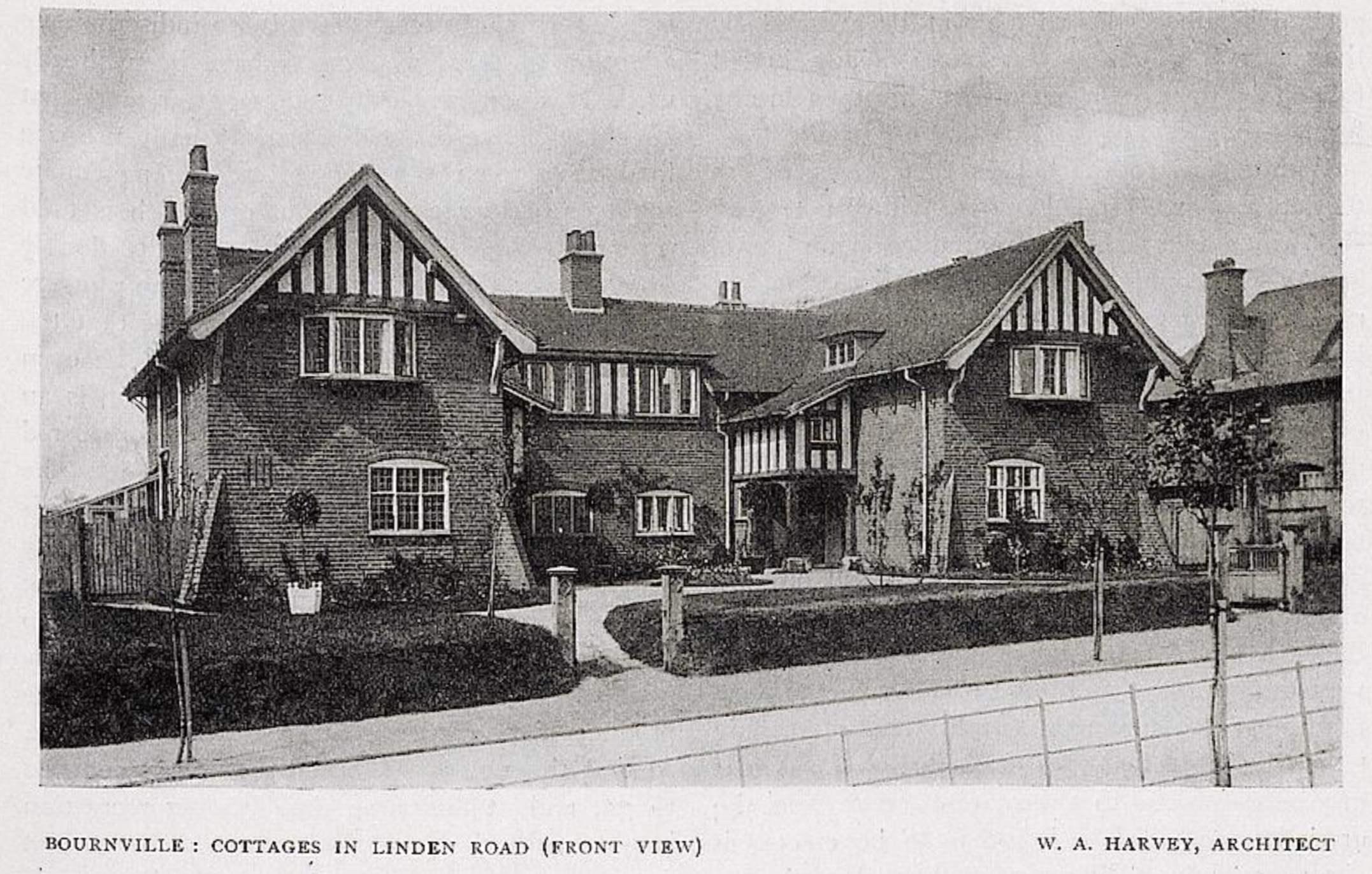
Cottages in Linden Road

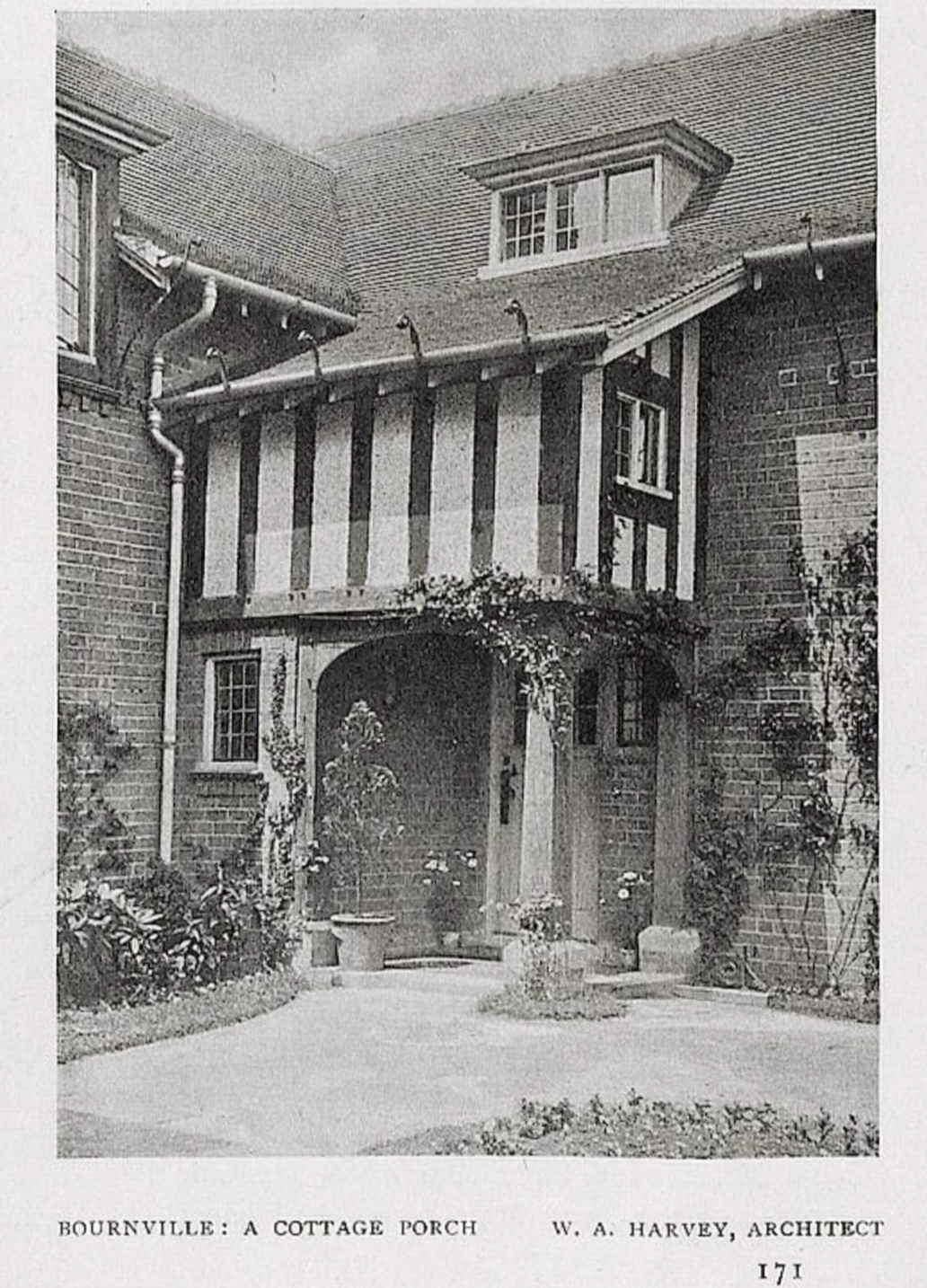
A cottages porch

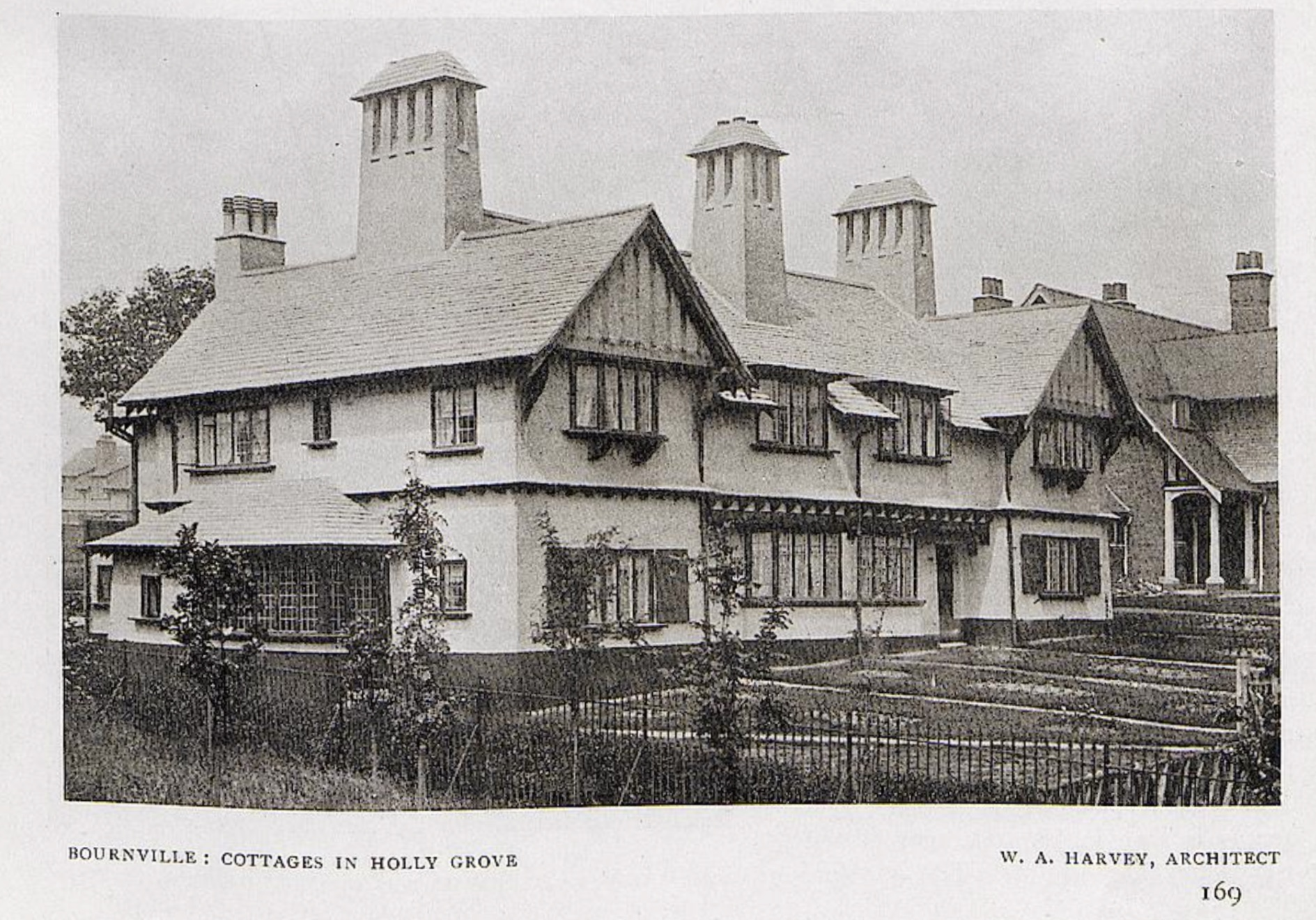
Cottages in Holly Grove

William Alexander Harvey FRIBA (11 April 1874 – 6 February 1951) was an English architect. He is most notable for his design of Bournville, the model 'garden suburb' built by Cadburys to house their chocolate-making workforce to the south of Birmingham.

== Biography ==
Born into an artistic family, Harvey studied architecture at the Municipal School of Art in Birmingham, and was appointed by George Cadbury to work on houses in Bournville in 1895 aged just 20.

Cadbury's objectives in Bournville were the construction of decent quality homes at prices affordable to industrial workers. The particulars stated that it was: "intended to make it easy for working men to own houses with large gardens, secure from the dangers of being spoilt either by factories, or by the interference with the enjoyment of sun, light and air".

Influenced by the Arts and Crafts Movement, many of Harvey's designs incorporated arty features such as stepped gables, small Venetian windows over canted bays, timber corner porches below dormers with very concave little leaded roofs. Houses at 10-12 Sycamore Road, Bournville, are typical. The village was a low rise development with a good provision of public and private open space.

From 1900, development of the village became the responsibility of the Bournville Village Trust. Harvey remained in the Trust's employment until 1904 when he set up his own architectural practice. From 1914 until at least 1935 his firm, Harvey and Wicks, was based at 5 Bennetts Hill, an important commercial street in central Birmingham. He continued to design public buildings in the village, but also designed houses, estates, municipal buildings and churches elsewhere in Birmingham and further afield. His 1906 book on model villages helped establish him as an expert on low cost housing and his schemes were employed by several English local authorities. From 1918 he also sat on the Executive Council of The Birmingham Civic Society.

From 2006 onwards, a section of the Lightmoor development at Telford was led by the Trust, recognising the longevity of the social and aesthetic principles demonstrated at Bournville and in other English garden suburbs.

== Works ==
In Bournville, Harvey designed:

- St Francis' Church (1925), Grade II listed
- the parish hall (1913), Grade II listed
- the Rest House (1914), Grade II listed
- the Bournville Junior School (1902-5), Grade II listed
- the adjoining Ruskin Hall (1903), Grade II listed
- the Infants' School (1910), Grade II listed
- the Friends' Meeting House (1905), Grade II listed

He rebuilt Selly Manor (1912–16), Grade II listed and Minworth Greaves (1929), Grade II listed.

In Selly Oak, he designed Kingsmead College (1905), Westhill College (1907), and Carey Hall (1912).

Further afield, he designed Dudley Council House (1935) with H. Graham Wicks.

== Bibliography ==
- The Model Village and its Cottages: Bournville. 1906. ISBN 1297004477. Also at Project Gutenberg

== Sources ==
- Images of England - Bournville and Weoley Castle, Martin Hampson, 2001, Tempus Publishing, ISBN 0-7524-2443-2
- Birmingham's Victorian and Edwardian Architects Harrison, Michael, 2009, Phillada Ballard. ed. Oblong. ISBN 978-0-9556576-2-7.
