= Anthony Abdy (British Army officer) =

British Army officer and cricketer (1856–1924)

Brigadier-General Anthony Abdy CB CBE
- Born: Anthony John Abdy; 26 April 1856; Cambridge, Cambridgeshire, England
- Died: 4 July 1924 (aged 68); La Tour-de-Peilz, Vaud, Switzerland
- Cricket career

Cricket information
- Batting: Right-handed

Domestic team information
- Years: Team
- 1881: Hampshire

Career statistics
Competition	First-class
Matches	1
Runs scored	30
Batting average	15.00
100s/50s	–/–
Top score	23
Catches/stumpings	–/–
- Source: Cricinfo, 21 September 2009

Brigadier-General Anthony John Abdy CB CBE (26 April 1856 – 4 July 1924) was an English first-class cricketer and an officer in the British Army. In the army, he served with the Royal Artillery from 1876 to 1918, seeing action in the Mahdist, Second Boer, and First World War's. In cricket, he played at first-class level for Hampshire County Cricket Club.

== Life and military career ==
The son of John Thomas Abdy, Regis Professor of Law at Cambridge and a County Court Judge, he was born at Cambridge in April 1856. He was educated at Charterhouse School, before attending the Royal Military Academy at Woolwich. He graduated from there in to the Royal Artillery (RA) as a temporary lieutenant in August 1876, which was made permanent in March the following year. During his career with the RA, he was known as a capable cricketer with RA cricket team, and played for Essex in 1876, prior to them gaining first-class status. He later made a single appearance in first-class cricket for Hampshire against the Marylebone Cricket Club at Lord's in 1884. Opening the batting twice in the match, he was dismissed in Hampshire's first innings for 7 runs by Wilfred Flowers, while in their second innings he was dismissed 23 runs by Arnold Rylott.

In the RA, he was promoted to captain in December 1884, with promotion to major following in July 1893. He subsequently served in Egypt in the Mahdist War, and in South Africa in the Second Boer War, where he commanded the 53rd Battery Royal Field Artillery, for which he was mentioned in dispatches. He was "slightly wounded" during the war in South Africa, but received the brevet rank of lieutenant colonel in November 1900, the substantive rank of lieutenant colonel on 26 September 1901, and was awarded the Queen's South Africa Medal with clasp at its conclusion. He was seconded to the staff as a temporary appointment in February 1902, whilst undertaking duties as a deputy-assistant quartermaster general for military intelligence at Army Headquarters; but returned to the Royal Artillery in February of the following year.

Abdy returned to South Africa following his secondment, where he commanded the Royal Horse Artillery and the Royal Field Artillery in the country between 1908 and 1912 with the rank of colonel, having achieved that rank in February 1907. He was made a Companion to the Order of the Bath in the 1911 Coronation Honours.

In April 1913, he was placed on retired pay, but returned to serve with the RA in the First World War, being appointed a temporary brigadier-general in the fourth month of the conflict and attached to headquarters. In April 1916, he was appointed to be an assistant military secretary. Abdy was granted the honorary rank of brigadier-general upon his retirement in June 1918, at which point he was appointed a CBE in the 1918 Birthday Honours. Abdy died in Switzerland at La Tour-de-Peilz. He was married into the Alice Laura Bonham-Carter, the daughter of the politician John Bonham-Carter. His nephew, Stuart Bonham Carter, and brother-in-law, Lothian Bonham-Carter, both played first-class cricket. His granddaughter was the forensic psychiatrist Elizabeth Tylden.
