= Edward Harvey (British Army officer) =

British Army officer and politician (1718–1778)

Lieutenant-General Edward Harvey
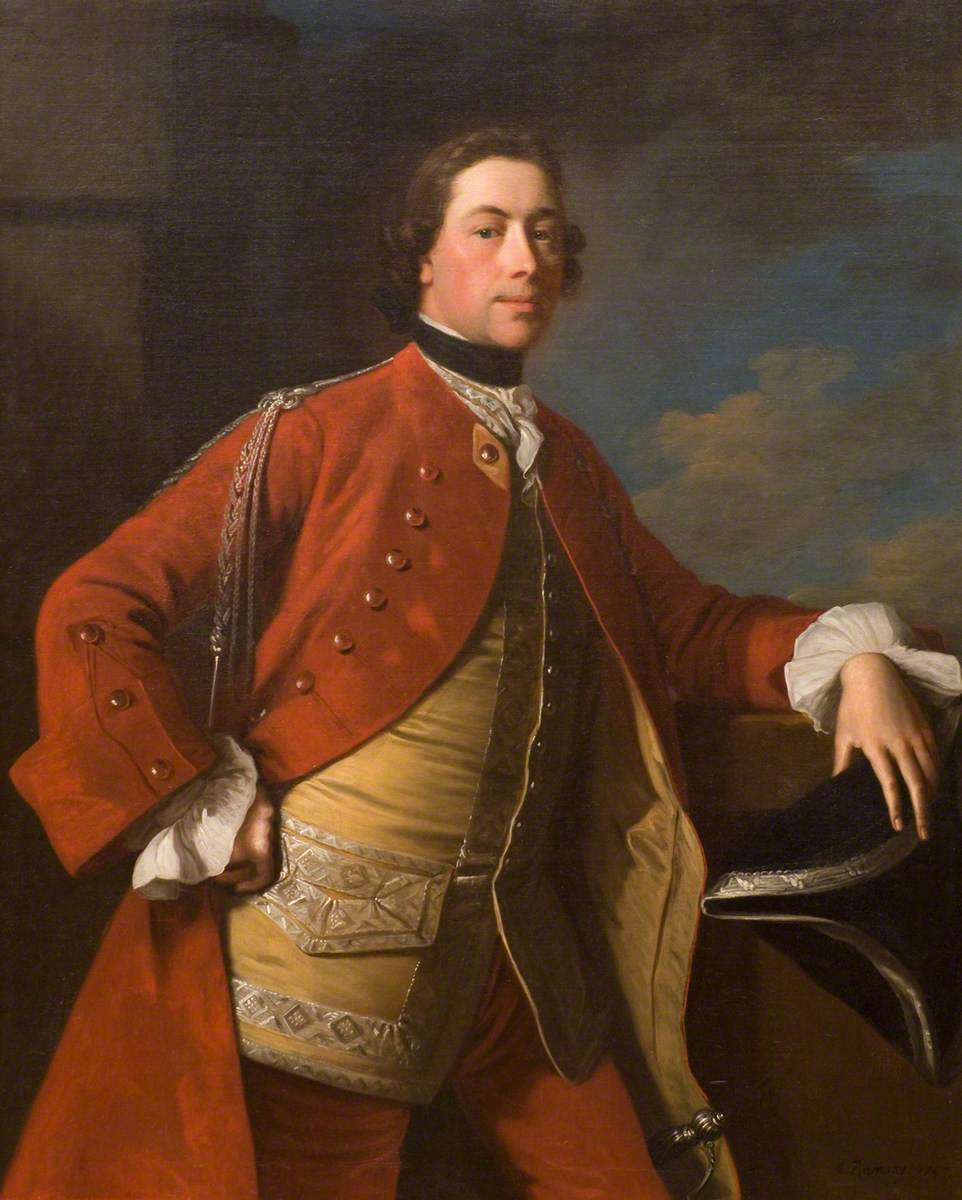
- Portrait of Harvey by Allan Ramsay
- Born: 1 August 1718
- Died: 27 March 1778 (aged 59)
- Military career
- Allegiance: Great Britain
- Branch: British Army
- Service years: 1741–1778
- Rank: Lieutenant-General
- Conflicts: Jacobite rising of 1745

Lieutenant-General Edward Harvey (1 August 1718 – 27 March 1778) was a British Army officer and politician who served as Adjutant-General to the Forces from 1763 to 1778.

== Early life ==
He was born the youngest son of William Harvey and Mary (née Williamson) and educated at Westminster School (1727–35) and Lincoln's Inn (1736).

== Military career ==
Harvey was commissioned as a cornet in the 10th Dragoons in 1741 and rose through the ranks to be promoted lieutenant-general in 1772. As a lieutenant he served as aide-de-camp to the Duke of Cumberland at the Battle of Culloden in 1746.

His military career culminated in him becoming Adjutant-General to the Forces in 1763: he died in office in 1778. He was given the colonelcy of the 12th Regiment of Dragoons from 1763 to 1764, of the 6th Dragoon Guards from 1764 to 1775 and of the 6th (Inniskilling) Dragoons from 1775 to his death. He was also Governor of Portsmouth from 1773 to his death.

== Parliamentary career ==
He was elected Member of Parliament for Gatton between 1761 and 1768 and for Harwich between 1768 and 1778.

Parliament of Great Britain
Preceded by William Bateman; Sir James Colebrooke	Member of Parliament for Gatton; 1761–1768; With: Thomas Brand	Succeeded by John Damer; Joseph Martin
Preceded by Thomas Bradshaw; John Roberts	Member of Parliament for Harwich; 1768–1778; With: John Roberts 1768–1772; Charles Jenkinson 1772–1774; John Robinson 1774–1778	Succeeded by George North; John Robinson
Military offices
Preceded by New Post	Adjutant General; 1763–1778	Succeeded by William Amherst
Preceded by Sir John Whitefoord	Colonel of the 12th Regiment of Dragoons; 1763–1764	Succeeded by Benjamin Carpenter
Preceded by Louis Dejean	Colonel of the 3rd Regiment of Horse (Carabiniers); 1764–1775	Succeeded by Sir William Augustus Pitt
Preceded by The Lord Tyrawley	Governor of Portsmouth; 1773–1778	Succeeded by Robert Monckton
Preceded by Hon. James Cholmondeley	Colonel of the 6th (Inniskilling) Dragoons; 1775–1778	Succeeded by James Johnston
