= Anthony Abdy (1579–1640) =

English merchant (baptised 1579 – 1640)

Anthony Abdy (18 October 1579 (baptised) – 10 September 1640), was a citizen and East India merchant of London. On the death of his father in 1595 he inherited lands at Colliers Row, Havering atte Bower, Essex and property in Red Lion Gate, London. He had a small book collection.

== Career ==
Abdy served as an alderman of the City of London and was Sheriff of London, 1630–31. He was appointed as a director of the East India Company in 1617 and as its deputy governor in 1639. He lived in Lime Street, London, in the house where William Dockwra’s Penny Post was established in 1680. He was a member of the Worshipful Company of Clothworkers and served as its Master in 1632. In 1630, he purchased the Felix Hall estate in Essex, which was bequeathed to his eldest son, Thomas.

Abdy had a small private book collection in his Lime Street home, valued at £12. In addition, the Felix Hall estate held a small number of books valued at 12s.

He was buried in St Mary Abchurch, London.

== Family ==
He married Abigail (d. after 1640), daughter of Sir Thomas Cambell, (who was Lord Mayor of London in 1609–10), on 14 August 1610 at St Mary Aldermary, London. They had six sons (three of whom became baronets): Sir Thomas Abdy (1612–86); Anthony Abdy (1615–22); Sir Robert Abdy (1616–70) of Albyns; Sir John Abdy (1617–62) of Moores in Salcot Verley; Nicholas Abdy (b. 1618) and Roger Abdy (1620–42) as well as three daughters: Alice Abdy (1611–69); Abigail Abdy (b. 1622; d. before 1640) and Sarah Abdy (b. 1624).
