= Sir Anthony Abdy, 5th Baronet =

British barrister and politician (c.1720–1775)

Sir Anthony Abdy

Member of the British House of Commons for Knaresborough
- In office 1763 – 7 April 1775
- Preceded by: Robert Hitch
- Succeeded by: George Cavendish

Personal details
- Born: c. 1720
- Died: 7 April 1775 (aged c. 55)
- Party: Whig

Sir Anthony Thomas Abdy, 5th Baronet, KC (c. 1720 – 7 April 1775) was a British barrister and Whig politician.

== Family ==
He was the eldest son of Sir William Abdy, 4th Baronet (of the 1641 creation), and his wife Mary Stotherd, daughter of Philip Stotherd. Abdy was educated at Felsted School and went then to St John's College, Cambridge. On 13 August 1747, Abdy married Catherine Hamilton, daughter of John Hamilton of Chancery Lane. Their wedding was held in St Paul's Cathedral in London. In 1750, he succeeded his father as baronet and in 1759, also inherited the estates of Sir John Abdy, 4th Baronet, the great-grandchild of the brother of his great-grandfather. These estates included Albyns, in Stapleford Abbotts, Essex, which he made his home.

Abdy suffered from gout in his last years, and died of it in 1775. Having no children, Abdy was succeeded in the baronetcy by his younger brother William. The Albyns estate passed to his nephew, Thomas Abdy Rutherforth (1755–98) and his other property, including Chobham Place in Surrey, to William.

== Political career ==
Abdy was admitted to Lincoln's Inn in 1738 and was called to the Bar after six years. He managed the estates of Sackville Tufton, 7th Earl of Thanet, and was adviser to Richard Boyle, 3rd Earl of Burlington. In June 1749, Abdy was one of the witnesses to the marriage of David Garrick and Eva Maria Veigel, along with the Countess of Burlington. In 1758, he became a bencher and in 1765 he was appointed a King's Counsel.

In 1763, Sir Henry Slingsby, 5th Baronet died and Abdy, with the support of William Cavendish, 4th Duke of Devonshire, Burlington's son-in-law, stood as Member of Parliament (MP) for Knaresborough, a seat he held until his death in 1775.

Parliament of Great Britain
Preceded by Lord John Cavendish; Sir Henry Slingsby	Member of Parliament for Knaresborough; 1763–1775; With: Lord John Cavendish 1763–1768; Robert Walsingham 1768–1775	Succeeded by Lord George Cavendish; Robert Walsingham
Baronetage of England
Preceded by William Abdy	Baronet (of Felix Hall); 1750–1775	Succeeded by William Abdy
