= Abdy baronets of Felix Hall (1641) =

Extinct baronetcy in the Baronetage of England

Abdy baronets
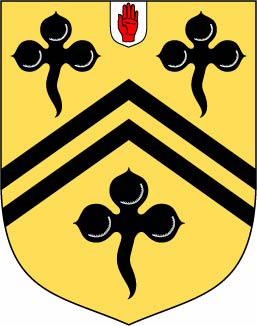
- Escutcheon of the Abdy baronets of Felix Hall
- Creation date: 1641
- Status: extinct
- Extinction date: 1868
- Seat: Felix Hall
- Motto: Tenax et fidelis (Firmness and faithfulness)

The Abdy baronetcy, of Felix Hall, in the County of Essex, was created in the Baronetage of England on 14 July 1641 for Thomas Abdy who was High Sheriff of Essex. The title became extinct in 1868.

== Abdy baronets, of Felix Hall (1641) ==
=== Sir Thomas Abdy, 1st Baronet ===
Sir Thomas Abdy, 1st Baronet (1612 – 14 January 1686), was an English lawyer and landowner, the son of Anthony Abdy and Abigail Campbell. Abdy was baptised on 18 May 1612, and educated at Trinity College, Cambridge, to which he was admitted in 1629 as a Fellow Commoner. He became a member of Lincoln's Inn in 1632. Abdy married Mary Corsellis on 1 February 1638 at St Peter le Poer, London, by whom he had three children, James (b. 1639, d. young), Rachael (born 1640) and Abigail (born 1644). Abdy inherited the family seat of Felix Hall, Essex, upon his father's death in 1640, and was created a baronet in the following year, on 14 July 1641. Mary died on 6 April 1645 and was buried at Kelvedon. On 16 January 1647, Sir Thomas made a second marriage, at St Bartholomew-the-Less, London, to Anne Soame, daughter of Sir Thomas Soame, an alderman of London. They had ten children: Anthony (1655–1704), Thomas (died 1697), William (died 1682), Joanna (1654–1710), Alice (born 1661), Anna (died 1692), Mary, Judith, Sarah, and Elizabeth. In 1651, Abdy was named High Sheriff of Essex, but continued to prosper after the Restoration, seeking a lease from the Crown soon afterwards of the sugar duty. He inherited the property of his cousin Sir Christopher Abdy of Uxbridge in 1679, the same year in which his wife Anne died, on 16 June 1679. Abdy died on 14 January 1686 and was buried at Theydon Garnons, Essex, being succeeded by his son Anthony. His monument at Theydon Garnons was, perhaps, designed by William Stanton.

=== Sir Anthony Abdy, 2nd Baronet ===
Sir Anthony Abdy, 2nd Baronet (1655 – 2 April 1704), was an English landowner, eldest surviving son of the 1st Baronet. Baptized on 4 July 1655, he was educated, like his father, at Trinity College, to which he was admitted in 1672. He married Mary Milward, daughter of Rev. Dr. Richard Milward, on 9 June 1682, by whom he had thirteen children: Thomas (d. young), Joanna (1686–1765), Elizabeth (born 1687), Anthony Thomas (1688–1733), William (1689–1750), Rachel (born 1690), Charles (born 1693), Richard (born 1694), Alice (born 1695), Margaret (1696–1779), Martha (1700–1780), Anna (died 1738) and Mary (b. c. 1703). Anthony succeeded to the baronetcy in 1686 on the death of his father, and died on 2 April 1704. He was buried at Kelvedon, where his monument was designed by Edward Stanton, and was succeeded by his son Anthony Thomas in the baronetcy.

=== Sir Anthony Thomas Abdy, 3rd Baronet ===
Sir Anthony Thomas Abdy, 3rd Baronet (1688 – 11 June 1733), English lawyer and landowner, was the eldest surviving son of the 2nd Baronet, and succeeded to the baronetcy in 1704. Abdy was admitted to Lincoln's Inn on 9 October 1708. His first wife was Mary Gifford, by whom he had no children. By his second wife, Charlotte Barnardiston (d. 19 February 1731), daughter of Sir Thomas Barnardiston, 3rd Baronet, he had one daughter, Charlotte, who married John Williams, son of Sir John Williams, Lord Mayor of London. By his third wife, a Miss Williams, he likewise had no male issue, and upon his death in 1733, was succeeded in the baronetcy by his brother William.

=== Sir William Abdy, 4th Baronet ===
Sir William Abdy, 4th Baronet (1689 – 25 January 1750), English landowner, was the second surviving son of the 2nd Baronet. He married the daughter of Philip Stotherd, and by her had three sons, Anthony Thomas (c. 1720 – 1775), Rev. Stotherd (d. 5 April 1773) and Capt. William, and several daughters, including Charlotte Elizabeth, who married Rev. Dr. Thomas Rutherforth on 11 April 1752. He succeeded to the baronetcy upon the death of his brother in 1733. On his own death in 1750, he was succeeded by his eldest son, Anthony Thomas.

=== Sir Anthony Abdy, 5th Baronet ===
Sir Anthony Thomas Abdy, 5th Baronet, KC (c. 1720 – 16 April 1775), English lawyer and landowner, was the eldest son of the 4th Baronet. He became a King's Counsel, and represented Knaresborough in the House of Commons from 1763 until his death in 1775. The baronetcy passed to his brother William.

=== Sir William Abdy, 6th Baronet ===
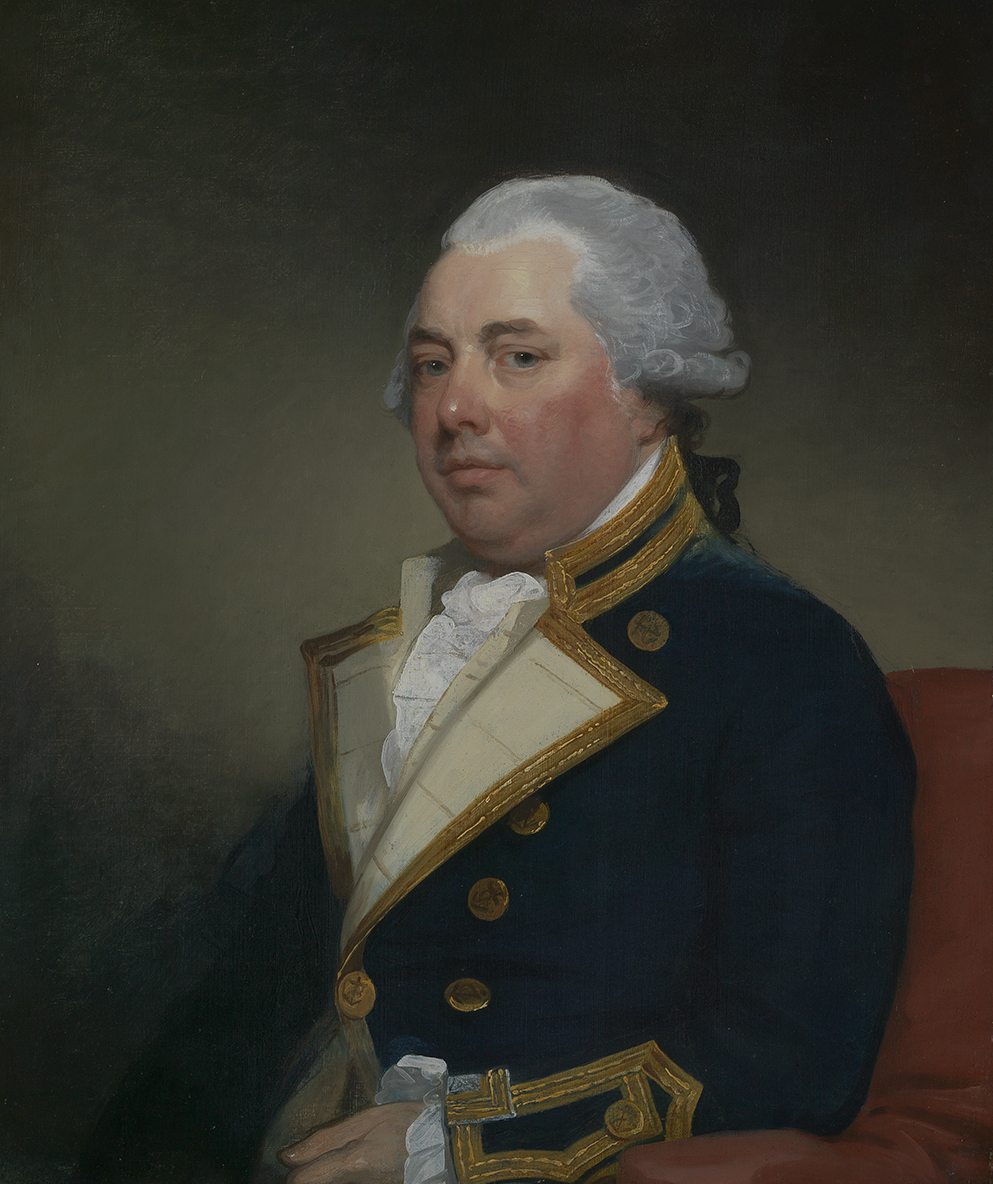
1780 portrait of Sir William Abdy, 6th Baronet by Gilbert Stuart

Captain Sir William Abdy, 6th Baronet (c. 1732 – 21 July 1803), English landowner and naval officer, was the third surviving son of the 4th Baronet. He entered the service of the East India Company and served as a midshipman aboard the True Briton from 1750 to 1752. He was then made fourth mate aboard the Stafford from 1753 to 1755. He afterwards transferred to the Royal Navy, and in 1761 he was made captain of HMS Beaver, a 14-gun sloop which had been built that same year. In 1755, he inherited the baronetcy from his brother Sir Anthony in 1775. He married Mary Gordon, daughter of James Brebner-Gordon, Chief Justice of Antigua, and sister of James Gordon MP. They he had one son, William (1779–1868).

=== Sir William Abdy, 7th Baronet ===
Sir William Abdy, 7th Baronet (1779 – 16 April 1868), English landowner, was the only son of the 6th Baronet. He was educated at Eton, and succeeded to the baronetcy in 1803. Abdy served in the militia and was an active magistrate for Surrey, and briefly served as a member of parliament. He married Anne Wellesley in 1806, but the two were divorced in 1816, without issue. The baronetcy became extinct upon his death.

== See also ==
- Abdy baronets
