= Abdy baronets =

There have been four Abdy baronetcies, three of which were created for sons of Anthony Abdy (1579–1640) in the Baronetage of England. These are extinct. The 1849 creation is dormant.

- Abdy baronets of Felix Hall (1641)
- Abdy baronets of Albyns (1660)
- Abdy baronets of Moores (1660)
- Abdy baronets of Albyns (1849)
