= Bournville Village Trust =

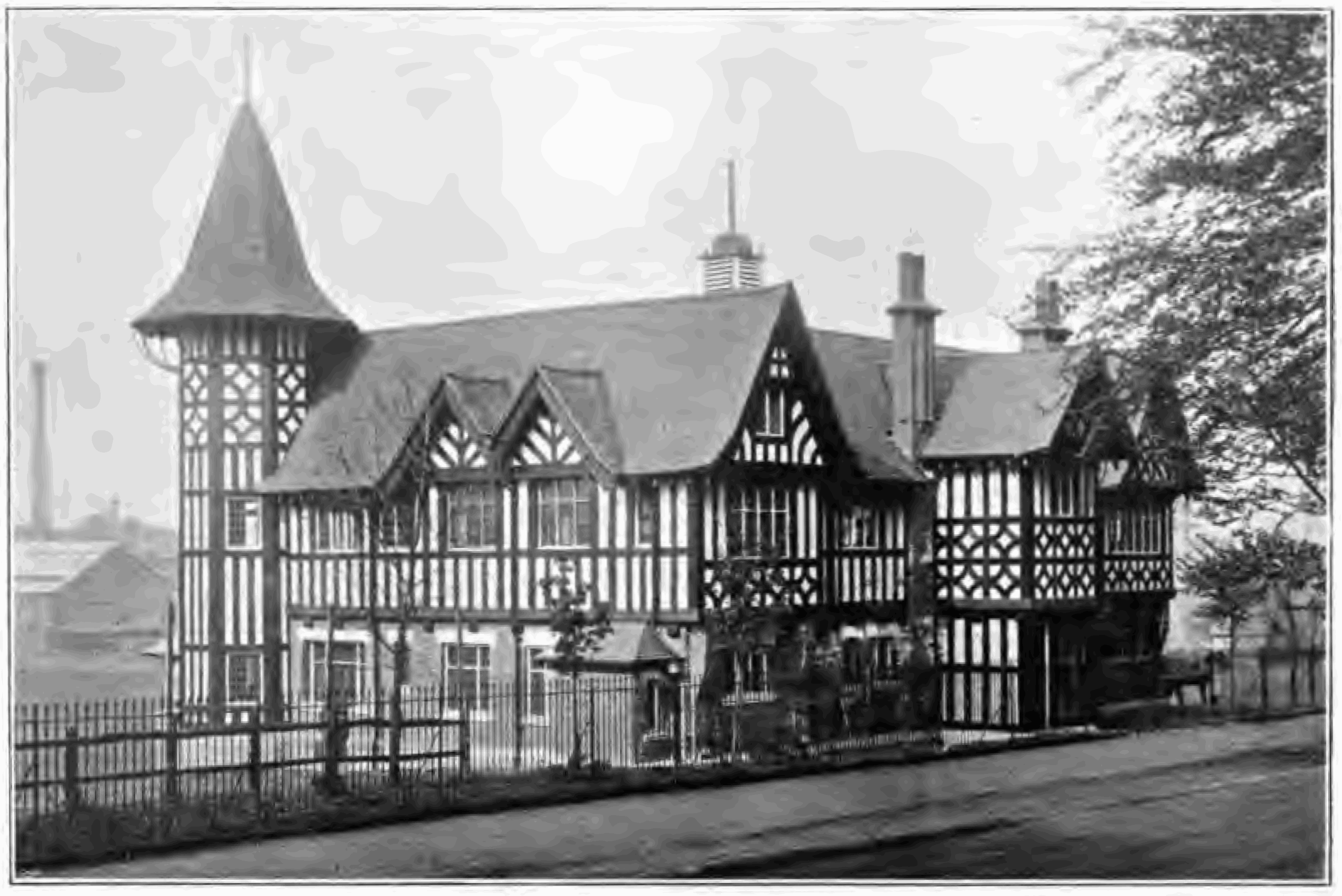
- The Coronation cricket pavilion in Bournville, built 1903.
- Founded: Bournville, Birmingham, England, 1900
- Headquarters: United Kingdom
- Revenue: 30,139,000 pound sterling (2016)
- Number of employees: 278 (2016, 2017)

Bournville Village Trust is an organisation created to maintain and improve the Birmingham suburb of Bournville. During the 20th century it expanded its geographical coverage to include developments in Shenley Green, Lightmoor in Telford, Bloomsbury in Nechells and Rowheath.

== History ==
Elizabeth Cadbury succeeded her husband as chair of the Bournville Village Trust in 1922. In 1861, George Cadbury and his brother Richard, took over their father's small business, Cadbury, then based in central Birmingham. The business expanded into the manufacture of pure cocoa and then chocolate bars and filled chocolates.

As the city premises was no longer large enough, the two brothers purchased land in the countryside, 4 miles (6.4 km) out of Birmingham at that time. Despite this rural location, the area had excellent canal and railway access. The Cadburys built a new factory in what became known as Bournville.

Owing to George Cadbury's Quaker beliefs, he sought to provide decent quality homes in a healthy environment which could be afforded by Cadburys workers. The houses were designed by architect William Alexander Harvey.

In 1900, Bournville Village Trust (BVT) was founded to administer and develop the village and its surroundings. The estate today covers 1,000 acres (400 ha), is home to some 23,000 people, and includes an exceptionally wide range of housing provision. The first manager was John Henry Barlow, whose wife Mabel Cash was a cousin of George Cadbury's wife Elizabeth Taylor. Barlow was a much respected Quaker from Cheshire, and was very instrumental in making the BVT a success. On his retirement, he was succeeded by Leonard Appleton. Appleton was succeeded by Barlow's son Ralph, who made the trust his life's work until he retired in 1975. The Ralph Barlow room in Bournville and Ralph Barlow House are named in his memory.

Bournville's green environment reflects the aim of George Cadbury that one-tenth of the estate should be "laid out and used as parks, recreation grounds and open space".

== See also ==
- Weoley Hill United Reformed Church
