= IDDS =

IDDS may refer to:

== Uses ==
- Infectious Disease Detection and Surveillance, a USAID program in Africa and Asia
- International Development Design Summit, a project to improve life in third-world countries
- Institute for Defense and Disarmament Studies, a US foreign policy research center
