= Cosmic Eye =

2012 film

Cosmic Eye is a short film and iOS app developed by International Centre for Radio Astronomy Research astrophysicist Danail Obreschkow in 2012. It shows the largest and smallest well known scales of the universe by gradually zooming out from and then back into the face of a woman called "Louise". According to the creator, the film and app were inspired by the essay Cosmic View (1957) and the short films Cosmic Zoom (1968) and Powers of Ten (1977), but use state-of-the-art technology and new scientific imaging and computer simulations. Developed in 2012 for local teaching and outreach purposes, Cosmic Eye suddenly attracted 40 million views in just ten days on the Facebook group page of "The Science Scoop" in April 2016 (increased to 150 million by the end of 2016).

A re-mastered Cosmic Eye V2.0 was released in 2018 in high-resolution landscape 16:9 format with slightly improved graphics including animated vector elements.

The woman whose eye is at the centre of the film is Louise McKay, a professional cellist from Western Australia.

== See also ==
- Cosmic Voyage, 1996 film
- The Scale of the Universe, 2010 interactive online visualization tool
