= Nuclear Freeze campaign =

Protests against nuclear weapon production

The Nuclear Freeze campaign was a mass movement in the United States during the 1980s to secure an agreement between the U.S. and Soviet governments to halt the testing, production, and deployment of nuclear weapons.

== Background ==
The idea of simply halting key aspects of the nuclear arms race arose in the early stages of the Cold War. Probably the first suggestion of this kind, discussed in letters between US President Dwight D. Eisenhower and Soviet Premier Nikolai Bulganin in the mid-1950s, called for a freeze on fissionable material. Concrete policy proposals began in the 1960s, with a formal proposal from the United States to the Soviet Union for a partial freeze on the number of offensive and defensive nuclear vehicles. However, the idea was rejected by the Soviet government, which feared that such a freeze would leave the Soviet Union in a position of strategic inferiority. In 1970, the US Senate passed a non-binding resolution calling for both superpowers to suspend further development of strategic nuclear weapons systems, both offensive and defensive, during negotiations for the SALT I treaty.

Behind a surge of support for the Freeze idea in the 1980s lay growing public concerns about the outbreak of nuclear war. In the late 1970s, Soviet-American détente unraveled and the Cold War began to revive, with new conflicts emerging in Africa, Central America, and Afghanistan. That caused nuclear arms control agreements between the two superpowers, such as SALT II, to be jettisoned and each embarked on dangerous nuclear expansion programs. The Soviet government began to replace its older nuclear weapons with more accurate, intermediate-range SS-20 missiles, directly threatening Western Europe. For its part, the US government announced plans for a NATO nuclear buildup with an enhanced radiation weapon (the neutron bomb) and, after that venture collapsed thanks to public protest, with a new generation of intermediate-range nuclear weapons: cruise and Pershing II missiles.

Along with their escalation of the nuclear arms race, national leaders employed a particularly hardline rhetoric. Ronald Reagan, who had opposed every nuclear arms control agreement negotiated by his Democratic and Republican predecessors, had denounced the SALT II treaty as “an act of appeasement.” While scornful of previous attempts at arms limitations, and championing a massive US nuclear weapons buildup, he nevertheless proposed and commenced negotiations for the Strategic Arms Reduction Treaty, (START I), which his successor, George H. W. Bush, signed in 1991. In other nations, stridently hawkish leaders, such as Britain's Margaret Thatcher, also came to the fore. Soviet leadership relied increasingly on nuclear weapons to implement its vision of Soviet security.

== Nuclear Freeze movement in the United States ==
=== Randall Forsberg and "Call to Halt the Nuclear Arms Race" ===
The Nuclear Freeze movement was initiated by Randall Forsberg, a young American who worked at the Stockholm International Peace Research Institute and, then, returned to the United States to become the executive director of the Institute for Defense and Disarmament Studies, a think tank that she had founded with the aim of reducing the risk of war and minimizing the burden of U.S. military spending. In 1979, she suggested to leading US peace organizations that they combine their efforts in support of a US-Soviet agreement to halt the testing, production, and deployment of nuclear weapons. When the peace groups, enthusiastic about her idea, urged her to write up a proposal along those lines, she produced the "Call to Halt the Nuclear Arms Race” in 1980. That Nuclear Freeze proposal emphasized that the freeze would retain the existing nuclear parity between the United States and the Soviet Union, thereby opening the way for deep reductions in nuclear weapons or their elimination in the future. In April of that year, having secured the support of the American Friends Service Committee, Clergy and Laity Concerned, and the Fellowship of Reconciliation, her Institute and these groups jointly published the “Call” and invited other peace organizations to endorse it.

The accessible goal set forth in the “Call” quickly became a popular rallying point. Its simplicity and moderation appealed to both peace activists and ordinary people concerned about the threats posed the nuclear arms race and nuclear war. Forsberg framed a Nuclear Freeze as a logical choice and pointed out that the United States and the Soviet Union already possessed more than 50,000 nuclear weapons and had plans to build 20,000 more. The memorandum also argued against the idea of deterrence by contending that adding more nuclear weapons to the world would only increase the chance of nuclear war. Additionally, Forsberg maintained that a nuclear weapons Freeze would result in substantial fiscal savings and detailed the social and economic benefits of various alternative domestic spending options.

After publication of the "Call to Halt the Nuclear Arms Race," the Nuclear Freeze not only garnered the support of most American peace organizations but also was endorsed by numerous public leaders, intellectuals, and activists. Former public officials, such as George Ball, Clark Clifford, William Colby, Averell Harriman, and George Kennan, spoke out in favor of the idea. Support for the proposal also came from leading scientists, including Linus Pauling, Jerome Wiesner, Bernard Feld, and Carl Sagan. In March 1981, riding a wave of growing public concern about the nuclear arms race, the first national conference of the Freeze movement convened at the Center for Peace Studies at Georgetown University.

=== Popular media ===
From the late 1970s to the mid-1980s, growing public anxieties about nuclear war coincided with a boom in anti-nuclear publications and media. Literature calling attention to nuclear dangers, which had previously commanded a modest market, became abundant as authors worked to galvanize the Nuclear Freeze campaign and were inspired by it in turn.

Jonathan Schell, a prominent journalist, wrote a series of powerful antinuclear essays for The New Yorker that, in 1982, were turned into a best-selling book, The Fate of the Earth. Becoming a cornerstone of the Nuclear Freeze campaign, it asserted in plain, direct language that nuclear war was more an extinction event than a proper war. Schell rejected the notion of surviving a nuclear war, providing visceral depictions of its grim aftermath. Ground Zero founder Roger Molander wrote a novel, Nuclear War: What's in it For You? It followed a fictional family after a hypothetical but possible nuclear war and explored the history of contemporary concerns regarding nuclear destruction. Both books were intentionally published at low prices.

Two of the most prominent legislators backing the Freeze campaign, US Senators Ted Kennedy (D-MA) and Mark Hatfield (R-OR), published their own book, Freeze! How You Can Help Prevent Nuclear War, that provided tools for readers to influence public policy and elections.

Helen Caldicott, a prominent member of the Freeze movement, was the subject of two documentaries in the early 1980s: films tackling this theme included Oscar nominated Eight Minutes to Midnight: A Portrait of Dr. Helen Caldicott and Oscar winning If You Love This Planet. If You Love This Planet won a Academy Award for Best Documentary (Short Subject).

=== Grassroots support ===
Initial efforts to advance the movement focused on alerting and educating the public at the local level. Activists distributed vast quantities of literature about the nuclear arms race and brought Freeze resolutions before a variety of organizations while securing signatures on Freeze petitions and placing Freeze referendums on town, city and state ballots around the country. "Think globally, act locally" served as a motto of the campaign. The movement placed a strong emphasis on grassroots education, thereby expanding the number of people supporting the campaign. On Veterans Day in 1981, the Union of Concerned Scientists held teach-ins in 150 schools, and in April of that year, Ground Zero mobilized a million Americans in high schools and colleges to circulate petitions, listen to debates, or watch films.

Through its efforts at the local level, the Nuclear Freeze movement attained considerable success. A Freeze resolution was first placed on the November 1980 election ballot in the towns of western Massachusetts. Thanks to the leadership of Randy Kehler, Frances Crowe, and other local activists, voters passed the resolution in 59 out of the 62 towns. In general, Freeze activism was stronger in Northern and Western states than in the more conservative South. Nevertheless, by mid-1982 it had taken root in three-quarters of the nation's Congressional districts. In March 1982, 88 percent of the 180 Vermont town meetings voted to support a bilateral nuclear weapons freeze between the United States and the Soviet Union. Furthermore, by November 1983, the Freeze had been endorsed by more than 370 city councils, 71 county councils, and by one or both houses of 23 state legislatures.

=== National impact ===
On June 12, 1982, the largest peace rally in U.S. history was held concurrently with the Second United Nations Special Session on Disarmament, with approximately a million participants. Many major U.S. religious bodies, such as the National Council of Churches, the Roman Catholic Church, the United Presbyterian Church, the United Methodist Church, the Episcopalians, the Lutherans, and the Synagogue Council of America, endorsed the campaign. Hundreds of national organizations, many of which had never before taken a stand on national defense issues, came out in favor of the Freeze. They included the American Association of School Administrators, the American Association of University Women, the American Nurses Association, the American Pediatric Society, the American Public Health Association, Friends of the Earth, the National Council of La Raza, the National Education Association, the U.S. Conference of Mayors, and the Young Women's Christian Association.

In 1982, when the Freeze campaign delivered its antinuclear petitions to the U.S. and Soviet missions to the United Nations, they contained the signatures of more than 2,300,000 Americans. Moreover, that fall, when Freeze referendums appeared on the ballot in 10 states, the District of Columbia, and 37 cities and counties around the nation, voters produced a victory to the Freeze campaign in nine of the states and in all but three localities. Covering about one-third of the U.S. electorate, this was the largest referendum on a single issue in U.S. history.

Patrick Caddell, one of the nation's leading pollsters, reported in October 1983 that the Freeze campaign was "the most significant citizens' movement of the last century... In sheer numbers the freeze movement is awesome," for there existed "no comparable national cause or combination of causes ... that can match ... the legions that have been activated."

In March 1982, a plan to introduce a Freeze resolution in Congress was announced by Senators Kennedy and Hatfield. The following May, the Democratically controlled House of Representatives passed a Freeze resolution by a vote of 278 to 149. In 1984, the Freeze was backed by all the major candidates for the Democratic presidential nomination and became part of the Democratic Party's presidential campaign platform.

== Parallels in global activism ==
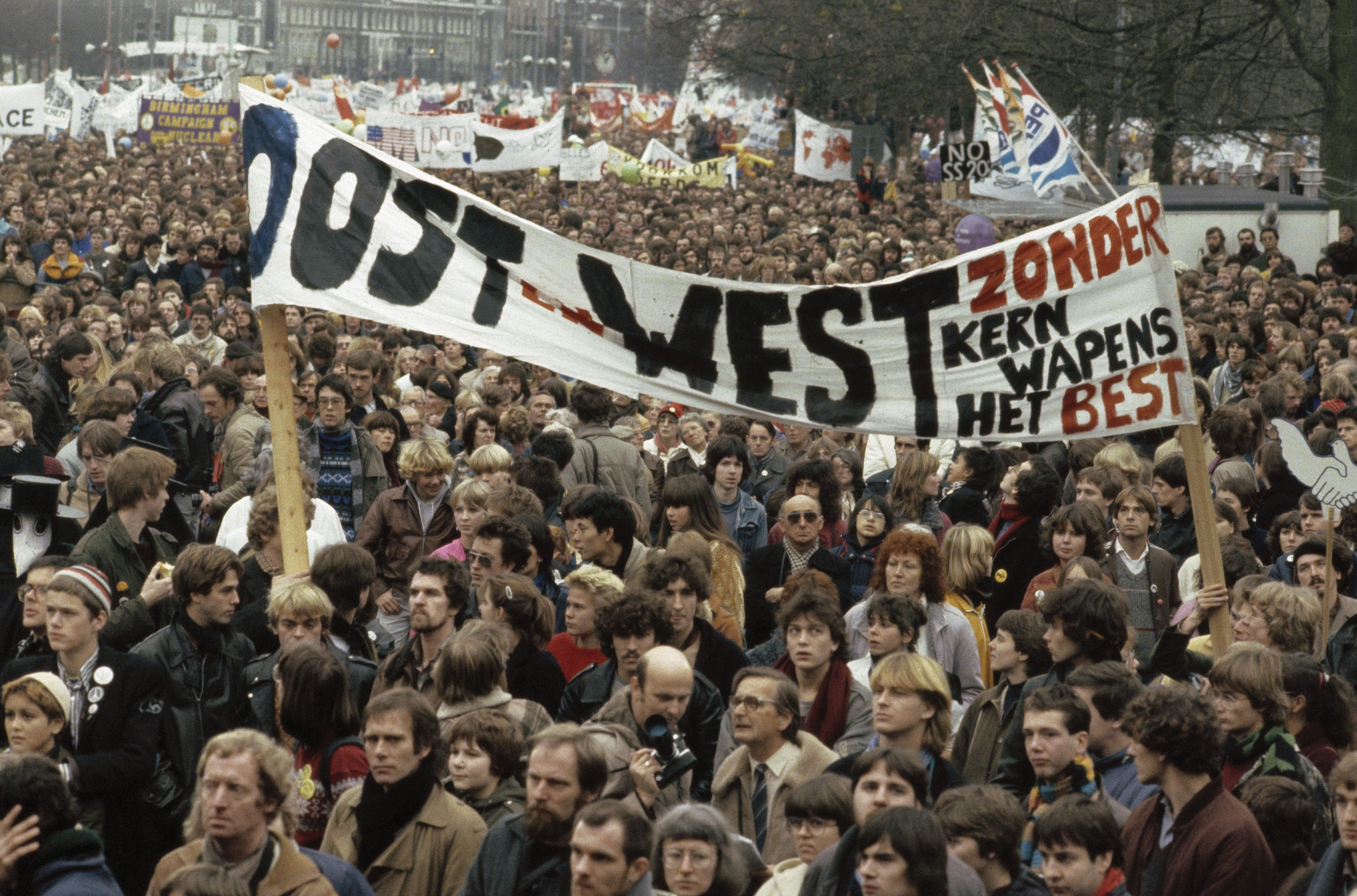
Protest in Amsterdam against the nuclear arms race between the U.S./NATO and the Soviet Union, 1981

During these same years, anti-nuclear activism also swept through most other parts of the world. West European groups, pulled together by an Appeal for European Nuclear Disarmament (END), geared up to oppose the deployment of the new generation of devastating Euromissiles: the cruise and Pershing II missiles from NATO and the SS-20s from the Soviet Union. This revival skyrocketed into mass protest after 1980, largely thanks to the advent of the Reagan administration and its hawkish pronouncements. END was soon coordinating a huge antinuclear campaign in Europe. Groups like the Campaign for Nuclear Disarmament (in Britain), the Interchurch Peace Council (in the Netherlands), church organizations and the new Green Party (in West Germany), and No to Nuclear Weapons (in Norway and Denmark) mushroomed into mass movements that held vast demonstrations. Antinuclear movements staged the largest protest rallies in the history of Japan, Australia, and New Zealand, while other Pacific Island nations drew together into a Nuclear Free and Independent Pacific Movement. In the fall of 1983, an estimated five million people took part in antinuclear demonstrations. Even in Communist nations, smaller-scale antinuclear movements and demonstrations began to appear, despite harassment and repression by the authorities.

Although the U.S. and overseas movements usually overlapped in their anxieties, methods, and goals, the American movement, at least on the surface, was more moderate. A Nuclear Freeze, after all, centered on a bilateral agreement that would merely halt the nuclear arms race. By contrast, many of the overseas movements called for unilateral disarmament initiatives by the nuclear powers. Nevertheless, in practice, both focused their efforts on opposing nuclear weapons buildups and shared the goal of a nuclear weapons-free world.

Leaders of these movements recognized that, if their campaigns were to be successful, collaboration among the world's antinuclear organizations was a necessity. When Forsberg officially launched the Nuclear Freeze campaign, an International Task Force was formed to serve as the overseas representative of the American campaign. The International Task Force first focused on lobbying for passage of a Freeze resolution at the United Nations. Two somewhat different Freeze resolutions came before the UN General Assembly―one sponsored by Mexico and Sweden and the other by India. Despite opposition by the U.S. government, the General Assembly passed both resolutions by significant margins. Naturally, the UN votes contributed to the mounting political pressure on the United States and Soviet Union to halt the nuclear arms race.

== Criticism ==
=== General ===
A key argument against the nuclear freeze movement was that it was an action that would leave the Soviet Union in a state of superiority. Polls show that while a majority of the public supported the freeze, they "did not support freezing a Soviet advantage in place". Time said the movement was "understandable, but in the view of many nuclear experts, the solution is impractical and unwise". McGeorge Bundy (a critic of the Reagan administration) said "the issues were far too complicated to be resolved by a bilateral freeze, which was a dubious notion in any case".

=== Resistance on the political right ===
The neo-conservative Commentary published an article claiming that there was “not the slightest doubt that this motley crowd is manipulated by a handful of scoundrels instructed directly from Moscow.” Human Events, which billed itself as “the national conservative weekly,” published numerous attacks upon antinuclear activists, including: “How Far Left Is Manipulating U.S. Nuclear `Freeze’ Movement.” In May 1982, the Heritage Foundation distributed a “Backgrounder” on “Moscow and the Peace Offensive” that called for a massive campaign to block the growth of the antinuclear movement in the United States and abroad. Meanwhile, the College Republicans distributed posters that, across a picture of Soviet troops in Red Square, plastered a headline proclaiming: “The Soviet Union Needs You! Support a U.S. `Nuclear Freeze.’”

The Christian Right also fiercely opposed the antinuclear campaign. Having long associated nuclear war with the Last Judgment, Biblical prophecy enthusiasts had no intention of interfering with what they considered the divine will. The Rev. Jerry Falwell, the nation's most popular evangelical preacher and a confidant of President Reagan, confidently described the approaching nuclear holocaust in a 1980 pamphlet, Armageddon and the Coming War with Russia. “Blood shall flow in the streets up to the bridles of the horses,” he assured an interviewer in 1981. Of course, this did not pose a problem for the faithful, for “if you are saved, you will never go through one hour, not one moment of the Tribulation.” As fundamentalism grew more political in the 1980s, its proponents saw in Reagan's nuclear buildup the working out of God's alleged plan. Groups like the Moral Majority began distributing “moral report cards,” rating members of Congress on their support for military measures. James Robison, the pre-millennialist television preacher who delivered an invocation at the 1984 GOP national convention, warned: “Any teaching of peace prior to [Christ's] return is heresy. . . . It's against the Word of God; it's Antichrist.”

Falwell's Moral Majority movement frequently denounced the Freeze movement. In a lengthy fundraising letter of June 17, 1982, Falwell promised “'a major campaign' against the 'freeze-niks.'” They were “hysterically singing Russia's favorite song,” he maintained, “and the Russians are loving it!” Beginning in the spring of 1983, he placed full-page newspaper ads in the New York Times, the Washington Post, and more than 70 other newspapers, assailing “the `freeze-niks,’ `ultra-libs,’ and `unilateral disarmers’” and exhorting “patriotic, God-fearing Americans to speak up” for military defense. He also aired a one-hour, prime-time TV special attacking the Freeze and used his weekly Sunday morning sermons, broadcast over 400 television stations around the country, to condemn the antinuclear campaign. The Nuclear Freeze, he said, led to “slavery for our children.”

=== Ronald Reagan administration ===
To the Reagan administration, the rise of the Nuclear Freeze movement represented a political challenge. As the White House communications director recalled: “There was a widespread view in the administration that the Freeze was a dagger pointed at the heart of the administration's defense program.” Robert McFarlane, Reagan's national security adviser, observed that “we took it as a serious movement that could undermine congressional support” for the administration's nuclear weapons buildup and potentially “a serious partisan political threat that could affect the election in '84.”

After Senators Kennedy and Hatfield introduced the Freeze resolution into Congress in March 1982, administration officials met and laid plans for what McFarlane called “a huge effort” to counter the Freeze movement. It soon involved the dispatch of officials from numerous government agencies to wage a public relations campaign against the Freeze propositions on the ballot that fall. Participating in the effort, Reagan appeared that July in his home state of California, where he charged that the Freeze “would make this country desperately vulnerable to nuclear blackmail.”

That fall, with the Freeze increasingly likely to emerge victorious at the polls and in Congress, Reagan grew more strident. Addressing a gathering of veterans groups in October, he insisted that the Freeze was “inspired by not the sincere, honest people who want peace, but by some who want the weakening of America and so are manipulating honest people.” In November, he told a press conference that “foreign agents” had helped “instigate” the Freeze campaign. Challenged to produce evidence for those accusations, Reagan pointed to two Reader’s Digest articles and a report by the House Intelligence Committee. However, the committee chair declared that according to FBI and CIA officials, there was “no evidence that the Soviets direct, manage, or manipulate the Nuclear Freeze movement,” a contention that was confirmed when FBI material was made public in 1983.

== Political developments ==
In April 1982, shortly after the Freeze resolution was introduced in Congress, Reagan began declaring publicly and repeatedly that “a nuclear war cannot be won and must never be fought.” On that first occasion, he added: “To those who protest against nuclear war, I can only say: ‘I'm with you.’”

Reagan personally feared a nuclear apocalypse and his strategy of a nuclear build-up was rooted in a belief that the economy of the Soviet Union could not sustain itself in an arms race with the United States. Ergo, a build-up would force negotiations for reduction.

Meanwhile, Reagan began to search, initially without success, for a Soviet leader with whom he could negotiate nuclear disarmament agreements. After three Soviet leaders died in the first four years of his Presidency, Reagan quipped: "How am I supposed to get anyplace with the Russians if they keep dying on me?"

== Decline and legacy ==
With the rise of Mikhail Gorbachev to the apex of Soviet leadership in March 1985, Reagan found his negotiating partner. Indeed, Gorbachev was a sincere and committed advocate of nuclear disarmament. In 1955, Gorbachev met Jawaharlal Nehru. His "principled stand against nuclear weapons" had a big impact on a young Gorbachev. His “New Thinking,” as his advisors recalled, was strongly affected by the Western nuclear disarmament campaign. As Gorbachev himself declared: “The new thinking took into account and absorbed the conclusions and demands of . . . the public and the scientific community . . . and of various antiwar organizations.”

In the United States, the Reagan administration managed to stave off the challenge posed by the Freeze campaign and other critics of its nuclear policies. In 1983, the Republicans used their control of the U.S. Senate to block passage of a Freeze resolution in that legislative body and, thus, by Congress. Walter Mondale, the 1984 Democratic presidential candidate (and supporter of the Freeze), lost to Reagan in a landslide. With the Freeze campaign's momentum blunted by these events, as well as by a rapid falloff in mass media attention after 1983, the movement declined and began to revise its approach and activities. In 1987, the Nuclear Freeze campaign merged with an allied group, the National Committee for a Sane Nuclear Policy, to form a new peace and disarmament organization, Peace Action.

In the years that followed, Reagan and his successor, George H.W. Bush, signed the INF Treaty, and the START I and START II Treaties. By the early 1990s, the United States and the Soviet Union had ceased the testing, and development and deployment of nuclear weapons. Moreover, they had substantially reduced their nuclear arsenals, and ended the Cold War.

Many consider the Freeze campaign to have largely "fizzled" and lost momentum after Reagan's reelection. Others, such as Arms Control Association, consider the movement's influence to have been groundbreaking and long-lasting, playing an important role in curbing the nuclear arms race and preventing a nuclear war.

== See also ==
- Cold War
- Cold War (1979-1985)
- Ronald Reagan
- Randall Forsberg
- Campaign for Nuclear Disarmament
- Peace Action
- Randy Kehler
- The Day After
