= Firebreaks War/Peace Game =

Firebreaks War/Peace Game is a 1983 game published by Ground Zero.

== Contents ==
Firebreaks War/Peace Game is a game in which the events leading up to a potential nuclear holocaust are explored, with players forming teams acting as advisors to either the U.S. President or the Soviet Premier.

== Publication history ==
The Firebreaks War/Peace Game is a role-playing crisis simulation created by Ground Zero, designed to educate groups about nuclear war prevention; over 7,000 groups across the country participated in the game, engaging in discussions and strategic exercises focused on conflict resolution and global security. In addition to promoting war/peace games such as Firebreaks and Let's Make a Deal, Ground Zero published works including Nuclear War: What's in It for You? and What About the Russians - and Nuclear War?

== Reception ==
Kevin J. Anderson reviewed Firebreaks War/Peace Game for Different Worlds magazine and stated that "Although at present it needs improvement as a game, Firebreaks accomplishes what it sets out to do - mainly by making the players terrifyingly aware of the realities of nuclear war, and how easily one can occur. The cost is low, and the experience is well worth the five hours spent playing it."
