= Cosmic Zoom =

- Directed by: Robert Verrall
- Produced by: Joe Koenig; Robert Verrall
- Cinematography: Tony Ianzelo; James Wilson; Wayne Trickett; Raymond Dumas
- Edited by: Karl Duplessis (sound)
- Music by: Pierre F. Brault
- Distributed by: National Film Board of Canada
- Release date: October 2, 1968
- Running time: 8 minutes
- Country: Canada
- Language: English

Cosmic Zoom is a 1968 short film directed by Robert Verrall and produced by the National Film Board of Canada. It depicts the relative size of everything in the universe in an 8-minute sequence using animation and animation camera shots. All drawings by Eva Szasz.

== Synopsis ==
The film starts with an aerial image of a boy rowing with his dog in a boat on the Ottawa River. The movement then freezes and the view slowly zooms out, revealing more of the landscape all the time. The continuous zoom-out takes the viewer on a journey from Earth, past the Moon, the planets of the Solar System, the Milky Way and out into the far reaches of the then known universe. The process is then reversed, and the view zooms back through space to Earth, returning to the boy on the boat. It then zooms in to the back of the boy's hand, where a mosquito is resting. It zooms into the insect's proboscis and on into the microscopic world, concluding at the level of an atomic nucleus. It then zooms back out to the original view of the boy on the boat.

== Inspiration and follow ups ==
The film was based on the 1957 essay "Cosmic View" by Kees Boeke. The 1968 short film Powers of Ten (updated in 1977) used the same idea and techniques, as did the 1996 IMAX film Cosmic Voyage.

== Release ==
Cosmic Zoom was one of seven NFB animated shorts acquired by the American Broadcasting Company, marking the first time NFB films had been sold to a major American television network. It aired on ABC in the fall of 1971 as part of the children's television show Curiosity Shop, executive produced by Chuck Jones. In the UK it was shown at least twice as a segment of the children's TV magazine programme Blue Peter.

== Awards ==
- Ibero-American Documentary Film. Festival, Bilbao: Gold Medal, 1969
- Trieste Science+Fiction Festival, Trieste: Golden Seal of the City of Trieste, 1969
- International Educational Film Festival, Tehran: Certificate of Merit, Scientific Films, 1969
- International Exhibition of Scientific Film, Buenos Aires: Diploma of Honor, 1970
- International Festival of Short Films, Philadelphia: Award for Exceptional Merit, 1970
- UNIATEC International Technical Film Competition, Berlin: Award of Excellence 1972

== See also ==
- Cosmic Eye, a similar film
- Earth's location in the universe
