= Powers of Ten (film series) =

Series of American documentary films

Coordinates: 41°51′53.93″N 87°36′48.21″W

- Title card for the 1977 version
- Directed by: Charles Eames; Ray Eames
- Based on: Cosmic View by Kees Boeke
- Narrated by: Judith Bronowski (1968); Philip Morrison (1977)
- Music by: Elmer Bernstein
- Distributed by: IBM; Pyramid Films
- Release date: September 4, 1977
- Running time: 9 min
- Country: United States
- Language: English

The Powers of Ten are two short American documentary films written and directed by Charles and Ray Eames. Both works depict the relative scale of the universe according to an order of magnitude (or logarithmic scale) based on a factor of ten, first expanding out from the Earth until the entire universe is surveyed, then reducing inward until a single atom and its quarks are observed.

== History and background ==
The first film, A Rough Sketch for a Proposed Film Dealing with the Powers of Ten and the Relative Size of Things in the Universe, was a prototype and was completed in 1968; the second film, Powers of Ten: A Film Dealing with the Relative Size of Things in the Universe and the Effect of Adding Another Zero, was completed in 1977.

The Powers of Ten films were adaptations of the book Cosmic View (1957) by Dutch educator Kees Boeke. Both films, and a book based on the second film, follow the form of the Boeke original, adding color and photography to the black and white drawings employed by Boeke in his seminal work.

The 1977 film has a number of changes from the prototype, including being entirely in color, moving the starting location from Miami to Chicago, removing the relativistic (time) dimension, introducing an additional two powers of ten at each extreme, a change in narrator from Judith Bronowski to Philip Morrison, and much-improved graphics.

== Synopsis ==
=== 1968 version ===
This version of the film has two clocks in the corner showing the comparison between the viewer's time and that of Earth time. As the viewer's speed increases, Earth time, relative to the viewer, also increases. It was installed in the Smithsonian Institution's National Air and Space Museum's Life in the Universe gallery at the time of the museum's opening in 1976, until the gallery's closure in 1978.

There is also a 1968 National Film Board of Canada film entitled Cosmic Zoom which covers the same subject using animation. It is wordless, using sped-up music during the return trips to normal size.

=== 1977 version ===
The film begins with an overhead view of a man and woman picnicking in a park at the Chicago lakefront — a 1-meter (3.3 ft) overhead image of the figures on a blanket surrounded by food and books they brought with them, one of them being The Voices of Time by J. T. Fraser. The man (played by Swiss designer Paul Bruhwiler) then sleeps, while the woman (played by Eames staffer Etsu Garfias) starts to read one of the books. The viewpoint, accompanied by expository voiceover by Philip Morrison, then slowly zooms out to a view 10 meters (33 ft) across (or 10^{1} meters in scientific notation). The zoom-out continues (at a rate of one power of ten per 10 seconds), to a view of 100 meters (330 ft) (where they are shown to be in Burnham Park, near Soldier Field, then 1 kilometer (3,300 ft) (where we see the entirety of Chicago), and so on, increasing the perspective and continuing to zoom out to a field of view of 10^{24} meters, or a field of view 100 million light years across. The camera then zooms back in at a rate of a power of ten per 2 seconds to the picnic, and then slows back down to its original rate into the man's hand, to views of negative powers of ten: 10 centimeters (10^{−1} meters), and so forth, revealing a white blood cell and zooming in on it—until the camera comes to quarks in a proton of a carbon atom at 10^{−16} meters.

== Reception and legacy ==
Physicist Robbert Dijkgraaf noted: "It is a brilliant short documentary [...]. If I wanted to show an alien how we view the world, I would show this movie".

In 1998, Powers of Ten, the 1977 version, was selected for preservation in the United States National Film Registry by the Library of Congress as being "culturally, historically, or aesthetically significant".

== Related books ==
- Morrison, Philip; Morrison, Phylis Morrison (1994) [1982]. Powers of Ten: A Book About the Relative Size of Things in the Universe and the Effect of Adding another Zero. Scientific American Library. ISBN 978-0-7167-6008-5.

== Related films ==
- Cosmic Zoom (1968), the aforementioned eight-minute short from Canada.
- Cosmic Voyage (1996), the Oscar-nominated loose remake of Powers of Ten in IMAX format for the National Air and Space Museum.
- Our Universe is SO big, it's mindblowing! (2021)

== See also ==
- Cosmic Eye (2012), remake of Powers of Ten
- Orders of magnitude
- Earth's location in the universe
