= Helene Stöcker =

German feminist, pacifist and gender activist

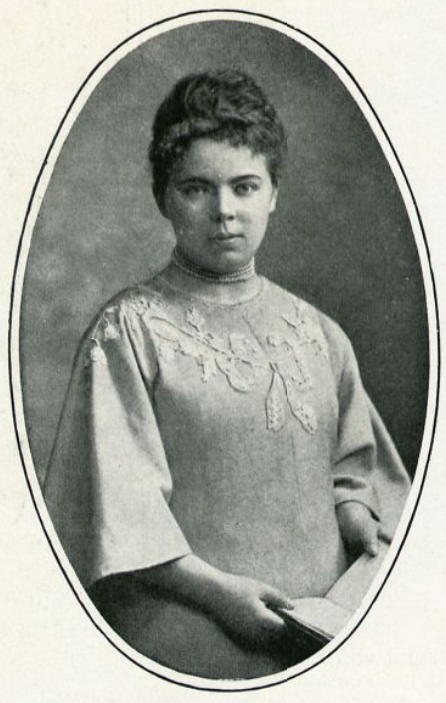
- Portrait of Stöcker, c. 1903
- Born: 13 November 1869; Elberfeld, North German Confederation
- Died: 24 February 1943 (aged 73); New York City, US
- Education: Royal Friedrich Wilhelm University of Berlin
- Alma mater: University of Bern
- Organization: Paco
- Notable work: Die Liebe und die Frauen
- Movement: Pacifism

Helene Stöcker (13 November 1869 – 24 February 1943) was a German feminist, pacifist and gender activist. She successfully campaigned to keep same sex relationships between women legal, but she was unsuccessful in her campaign to legalise abortion. She was a pacifist in Germany and joined the Deutsche Friedensgesellschaft. As war emerged, she fled to Norway. As Norway was invaded, she moved to Japan and emigrated to America in 1942.

== Life ==
Born in Elberfeld, Stöcker was raised in a Calvinist household and attended a school for girls which emphasised rationality and morality. She moved to Berlin to continue her education and then she studied at the University of Bern, where she became one of the first German women to receive her doctorate. In 1905, she helped found the League for the Protection of Mothers (Bund für Mutterschutz, BfM), and she became the editor of the organisation's magazine Mutterschutz (1905–1908) and then Die Neue Generation (1906–1932).

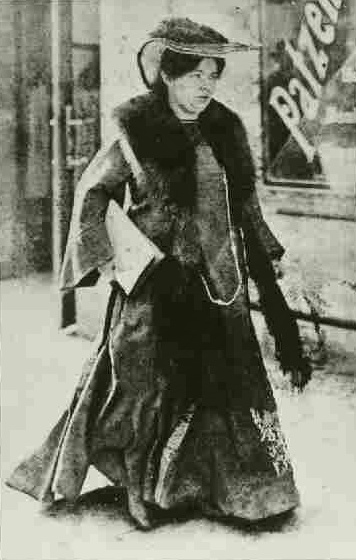
Photograph of Stöcker walking in the street (possibly Berlin), c. 1900

In 1909, she joined Magnus Hirschfeld in successfully lobbying German parliament from including lesbian women in the law criminalising homosexuality. Stöcker's influential new philosophy, called the New Ethic, advocated the equality of illegitimate children, legalisation of abortion, and sexual education, all in the service of creating deeper relationships between men and women which would eventually achieve women's political and social equality. This was received with dismay from more conservative women's organisations in Imperial Germany.

Stöcker's plaque in Berlin

During World War I and the Weimar period, Stöcker's interest shifted to activities in the peace movement. In 1921 in Bilthoven, together with Kees Boeke and Wilfred Wellock, she founded an organisation with the name Paco (the Esperanto word for "peace") and later known as War Resisters' International (Internationale der Kriegsdienstgegner, WRI). She was also very active in the Weimar sexual reform movement. The Bund für Mutterschutz sponsored a number of sexual health clinics, which employed both lay and medical personnel, where women and men could go for contraception, marriage advice, and sometimes abortions and sterilisation. From 1929 to 1932, she took one last stand for abortion rights. After a papal encyclical, the Casti connubii, issued on 31 December 1930 denounced sex without the intent to procreate, the radical sexual reform movement collaborated with the Socialist and Communist parties to launch one final campaign against paragraph 218, which prohibited abortion. Stöcker added her iconic voice to a campaign that ultimately failed.

When the Nazis came to power in Germany, Stöcker fled first to Switzerland and then to England when the Nazis invaded Austria. Stöcker was attending a PEN writers conference in Sweden when war broke out and remained there until the Nazis invaded Norway, at which point she took the Trans-Siberian Railway to Japan and finally ended up in the United States in 1942. She moved into an apartment on Riverside Drive in NYC and died there of cancer in 1943.

== Published works ==
=== Books ===
- 1906 – Die Liebe und die Frauen. Ein Manifest der Emanzipation von Frau und Mann im deutschen Kaiserreich.
- 1928 – Verkünder und Verwirklicher. Beiträge zum Gewaltproblem.

=== Papers ===
- Frauen-Rundschau, 1903–1922
- Mutterschutz, newspaper of the Bund für Mutterschutz, published from 1905 to 1907.
- Die Neue Generation, 1908–1932.
