= Randall Forsberg =

American peace activist and political scientist (1943–2007)

- Born: Randall Watson; July 23, 1943; Huntsville, Alabama, U.S.
- Died: October 19, 2007 (aged 64); Brooklyn, New York City, U.S.
- Other name: Randy
- Occupations: peace activist; political scientist
- Title: Founder of Institute for Defense and Disarmament Studies; Founder of Nuclear Freeze campaign
- Spouse: Gunnar Forsberg (m. 1967)
- Children: 1
- Father: Douglass Watson

Dr. Randall Caroline Forsberg (July 23, 1943 – October 19, 2007) led a lifetime of research and advocacy on ways to reduce the risk of war, minimize the burden of military spending, and promote democratic institutions. Her career started at the Stockholm International Peace Research Institute in 1968. In 1974 she moved to Cambridge, Massachusetts (where she earned her Ph.D. in 1980) to found the Institute for Defense and Disarmament Studies (IDDS) as well as to launch the national Nuclear Freeze campaign.

Randall Forsberg was accompanied by an important colleague by the name of Helen Caldicott while she was leading the Nuclear Freeze movement in both Manhattan and Central Park. Both women were met with many challenges in their efforts to lead the Nuclear Freeze Movement. These challenges included gender discrimination and discrediting as influential leaders by the media.

Forsberg's strong leadership in the nuclear freeze movement is thought to be very influential in the writing of foreign policy during the Reagan administration and is even credited with catalyzing the negotiation of the INF treaty between President Reagan and Mikhail Gorbachev.

== Biography ==
=== Early years and career ===
Randall Forsberg, born in Huntsville, Alabama, often referred to as "Randy", was the daughter of Douglass Watson. She graduated from Columbia University in 1965 and later moved to Pennsylvania where she taught English and married her husband Gunnar Forsberg, and moved to Stockholm in 1967. The couple later divorced. It is here that she became interested in arms control issues while working at the Stockholm International Peace Research Institute as a typist in the late 1960s and early 1970s. In 1974, she returned to the United States, and became a graduate student in defense studies in the Department of Political Science at the Massachusetts Institute of Technology.

=== Institute for Defense and Disarmament Studies ===
After earning her Ph.D. in 1980, she founded the Institute for Defense and Disarmament Studies (IDDS). The IDDS is a non-profit center that studies global military policies, arms holdings, production and trade. As director of the IDDS, Forsberg was responsible for publishing the Arms Control Reporter monthly and IDDS Almanac: World Arms Holdings, Production, and Trade once a year. IDDS became an important resource for the peace movement and anti-nuclear weapons movement.

=== Nuclear Freeze movement ===
In December 1979, Forsberg gave a speech in Louisville at the annual meeting of Mobilization for Survival, an anti-nuclear organization. It is this speech that gained Forsberg momentum for her anti-nuclear campaign and led her to publish Call to Halt the Arms Race in 1979. This publication was the manifesto of the Nuclear Freeze Campaign. The four-paged document advocated a bilateral halt to the testing, production, deployment and delivery of nuclear weapons. By 1982, Forsberg's nuclear freeze campaign had gained support from various state and county governments, over 100 national organizations, numerous large labor unions, and many other organizations. Support for Forsberg's grassroots movement was very evident in 1982 when the freeze resolutions appeared on ballots in nine states. The polls showed that 10.8 million out of 18 million US citizens voted in favor of the freeze. On June 12 of the same year, approximately one million people gathered in Central Park to show their support for a Nuclear Freeze at anti-nuclear weapon rally.

=== MacArthur Foundation genius grant ===
In 1983, Forsberg was awarded a $204,000 MacArthur Foundation genius grant for showing unique artistic, intellectual or social creativity. After receiving the MacArthur Foundation grant, Randall became president of a group known as Freeze Voter. This group organized and collected large amounts of money in an effort to endorse candidates in the 1984 election who were for nuclear disarmament.

=== Anne and Bernard Spitzer Professorship ===
In 2005 she became Anne and Bernard Spitzer Professorship in Political Science and International Security Studies at the City College of New York.

Forsberg also served as a board member for the Arms Control Association.

=== Death ===
Forsberg died of endometrial cancer on October 19, 2007 at the age of 64. She is survived by her daughter, Katarina Forsberg.

Upon Forsberg's untimely death, Professor Judith Reppy, as chair of the Institute for Defense and Disarmament Studies (IDDS) board, assumed responsibility for the IDDS archive and facilitated it's transfer to the Cornell University Library.

== Campaigns ==
- 2002: write-in candidate for Senate, Massachusetts.
- 1980: launched the national Nuclear Weapons Freeze Campaign.

== Government service ==
- 1995: appointed by President Clinton to Advisory Committee of US Arms Control and Disarmament Agency.
- 1989: briefed President Bush and his Cabinet officials on US-Soviet arms control issues.
- Served on panels for the US Congressional Research Service, the US General Accounting Office, and the US Office of Technology Assessment;
- Testified before US Congress
- Testified before Swedish Parliament
- three visits to Seoul, South Korea, in 2001 to participate in panels on North-South Korean reconciliation and arms reductions—two at the invitation of the South Korean military, and one at the invitation of South Korean peace activists.
- Served on Advisory Panel for the U.S. Office of Technology Assessment

Talks at West Point, the US Air Force Academy, the National Defense University, and the German War College; and met with senior government officials of Russia, China, Germany, Norway, and other countries. She was on the board or advisory board of the Boston Review, Arms Control Association, Journal of Peace Research, University of California Institute for Global Cooperation and Conflict, and Women's Action for New Directions from ____ until her death in 2007.

== Awards ==
- 1989: Pomerance Award
- 1983: MacArthur Foundation Fellowship

== Education ==
- B.A. Columbia University
- Ph.D. Political Science: Defense Policy; Massachusetts Institute of Technology (MIT)

== Publications ==
=== Journals ===
- IDDS Database of World Arms Holdings, Production, and Trade. (annual)
- Arms Control Reporter, Institute for Defense and Disarmament Studies (monthly since 1982)

=== Articles ===
- "Citizens and Arms Control", Boston Review, October/November 2002
- Randall Forsberg and Jonathan Cohen make it clear that the U.S. has no nation-state enemies left who could mount a sustained threat to our national security; see "Issues and Choices in Arms Production and Trade," in Randall Forsberg, editor, THE ARMS PRODUCTION DILEMMA (Cambridge, Massachusetts: MIT Press, 1994), pgs. 269–290.
- the Call to Halt the Nuclear Arms Race, the manifesto of the Nuclear Weapons Freeze Campaign, and she helped found and lead the campaign. 1980
- "Randall Forsberg discusses her work and the current international situation", Peace Magazine, Aug-Sep 1989.

As well as articles in Scientific American, International Security, Technology Review, Bulletin of the Atomic Scientists, and World Policy Journal.

=== Books ===
- Abolishing War: Culture and Institutions (with Elise Boulding, brc21.org: 1998).
- Nonproliferation Primer (with William Driscoll, Gregory Webb and Jonathan Dean) MIT Press April 1995 168 pp., 15 illus.
- The Arms Production Dilemma: Contraction and Restraint in the World Combat Aircraft Industry (MIT Press November 1994)320 pp.
- Cutting Conventional Forces (1DDS: 1989)
- Peace Resource Book (Lexiston Books: 1985)
- The Price of Defense (NYTimes: 1979)
- Resources Devoted to Military Research and Development: An International Comparison (SIPRI: 1972)
- Towards a Theory of Peace: The Role of Moral Beliefs (with Matthew Evangelista and Neta Crawford) Cornell Global Perspectives: 2019
- Arms Control in the New Era: Linked Restraints on Arms Deployment, Production, and Trade (MIT Press: 1995)

== See also ==
- Institute for Defense and Disarmament Studies
- Nuclear Weapons Freeze Campaign
- Intermediate-Range Nuclear Forces Treaty
- List of peace activists
