= Kees Boeke =

Dutch educator, Quaker missionary and pacifist

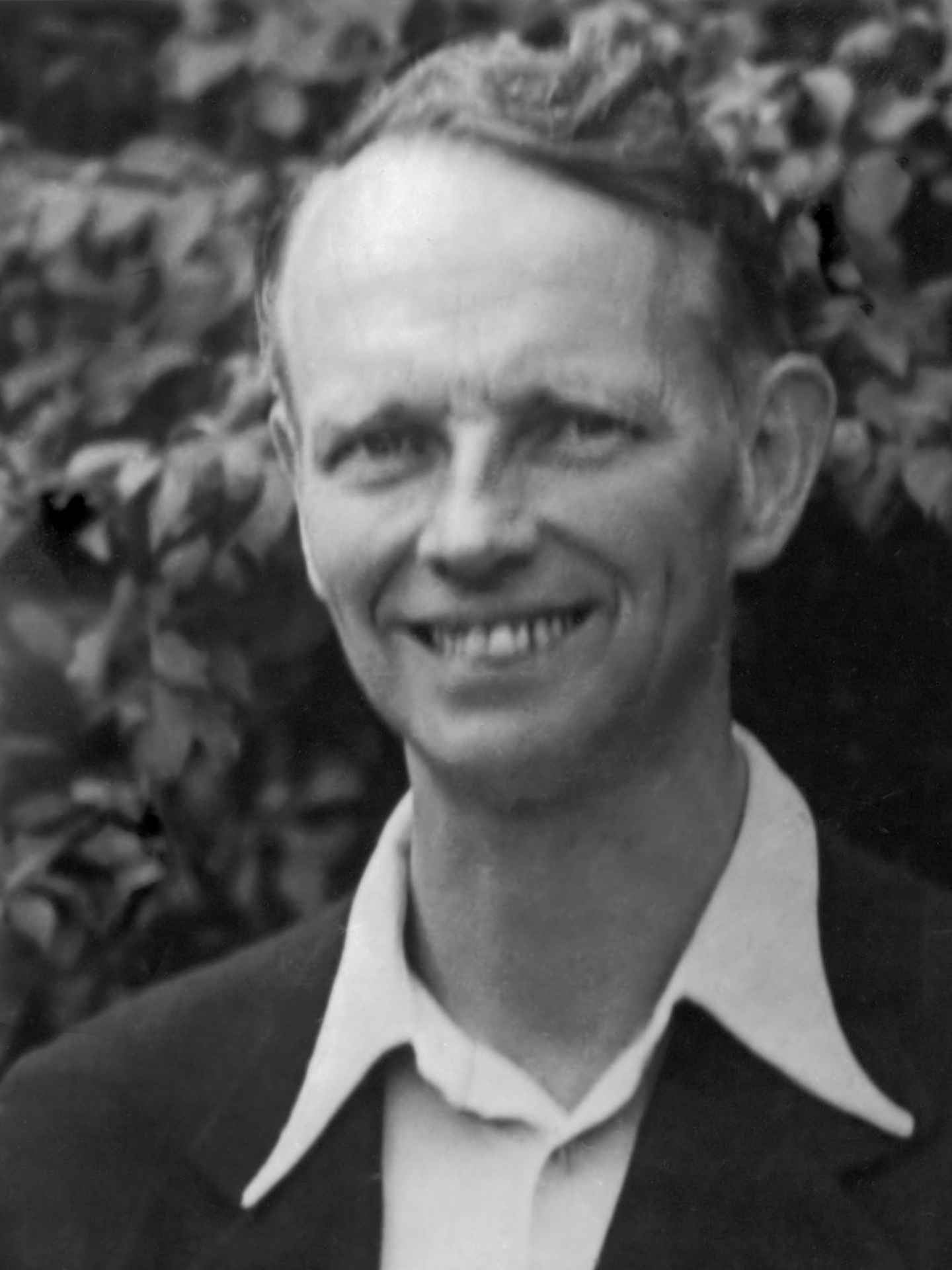
- Born: Cornelis Boeke; 25 September 1884; Alkmaar, Netherlands
- Died: 3 July 1966 (aged 81); Abcoude, Netherlands
- Occupation(s): Educator, missionary
- Organizations: International Fellowship of Reconciliation; Service Civil International; War Resisters' International
- Known for: Peace activism
- Notable work: Cosmic View
- Spouse: Beatrice "Betty" Cadbury (m. 1911)
- Children: 8

Cornelis "Kees" Boeke (25 September 1884 – 3 July 1966) was a Dutch reformist educator, Quaker missionary and pacifist. He is best known for his popular essay/book Cosmic View (1957) which presents a seminal view of the universe, from the galactic to the microscopic scale, and which inspired several films.

Boeke tried to reform education by allowing the children to contribute their ideas. He called this process sociocracy and regarded schools as workshops, with pupils as workers, and teachers as co-workers. Based on Quaker ideas, he wanted the children to respect democracy. In 1926, he founded a school in Bilthoven, which he led until 1954. As a child, the later Dutch Queen Beatrix attended the school.

== Biography ==
Boeke was born on 25 September 1884 to a Mennonite family in Alkmaar, Netherlands, where he grew up. He studied architecture at the Delft University of Technology. As a student, he spent a year in England, where he met the Quakers. He became a Quaker and attended Woodbrooke Quaker Study Centres, a college in Selly Oak, Birmingham. There, he found inspiration in Bournville, the garden village which the Cadbury family (owners of the chocolate factory) had built for their workers. He met and married Beatrice (Betty) Cadbury. The couple went to modern day Lebanon in 1912 as Quaker missionaries, where Kees was headmaster at the Brummana School. In 1914, after the outbreak of World War I, they returned to England. They became active in peace work, the Fellowship of Reconciliation having come into being in 1914 through Henry Hodgkin. In 1915 Boeke traveled to Berlin, where he met Friedrich Siegmund-Schultze, with whom Hodgkin had been working at the outbreak of war. Boeke began to speak publicly in England: "The Germans are our brothers; God did not create man that he might kill; the war will find its quickest end when all soldiers lay down their weapons." He was deported from Britain and returned to the Netherlands. His family followed; there they lived in Bilthoven, near Utrecht. Their home soon became a pacifist centre. Later in the Second World War, Boeke took part in the underground Dutch resistance movement against the same Germans that he called brothers before. This was, however, in line with his ideas of anti-authoritianism and his disapproval of war and prosecution.

After the First World War, Boeke erected a large conference centre in Bilthoven, which he called "Brotherhood House." The first international peace conference took place there between 4 and 11 October 1919. Present at the conference were Leon Revoyne, Mathilda Wrede, Leonard Ragaz, Pierre Ceresole, as well as Hodgkin and Schultze. Boeke and Ceresole became the secretaries of this movement, which initially called itself "Christian International", later the International Fellowship of Reconciliation. Together with Helene Stöcker, and Wilfred Wellock, they founded the Service Civil International and in 1921 "Paco" (the Esperanto word for peace), which in 1923 became War Resisters' International (WRI).

Kees and Betty Boeke considered war to be rooted in the entanglement of the state and capitalism. As Betty was a Cadbury, she inherited large shares in her family's firm. She renounced her wealth, transferring this money to various charitable organizations such as the Quaker-Help Organisation in Russia in 1920. Later, she gave the shares to a trust for the workers of the Cadbury factory. For a while, the Boekes abstained from using money, so as to avoid contributing to the state — since public funds are also spent on weapons. They never used public transport, nor did they pay postage, tolls, or taxes. As a result, they were imprisoned several times. On one occasion the Dutch tax authorities auctioned off the estate in order to recover taxes. Queen Wilhelmina was in attendance at the auction, and purchased Kees' favorite violin, only to return it to him on the spot. Boeke supported his family by working in Utrecht in a building association which he had founded; he did not work as an architect (which was his training), but as a simple worker.

In the late 1920s Boeke increasingly withdrew from international peace movements. Believing he could build a better society through educating children, he started a school called "De werkplaats" (the workshop). He founded his school in 1926 when all private schools, including the Montessori school his children attended, started receiving an equal amount of money per child from the state, to which he objected.

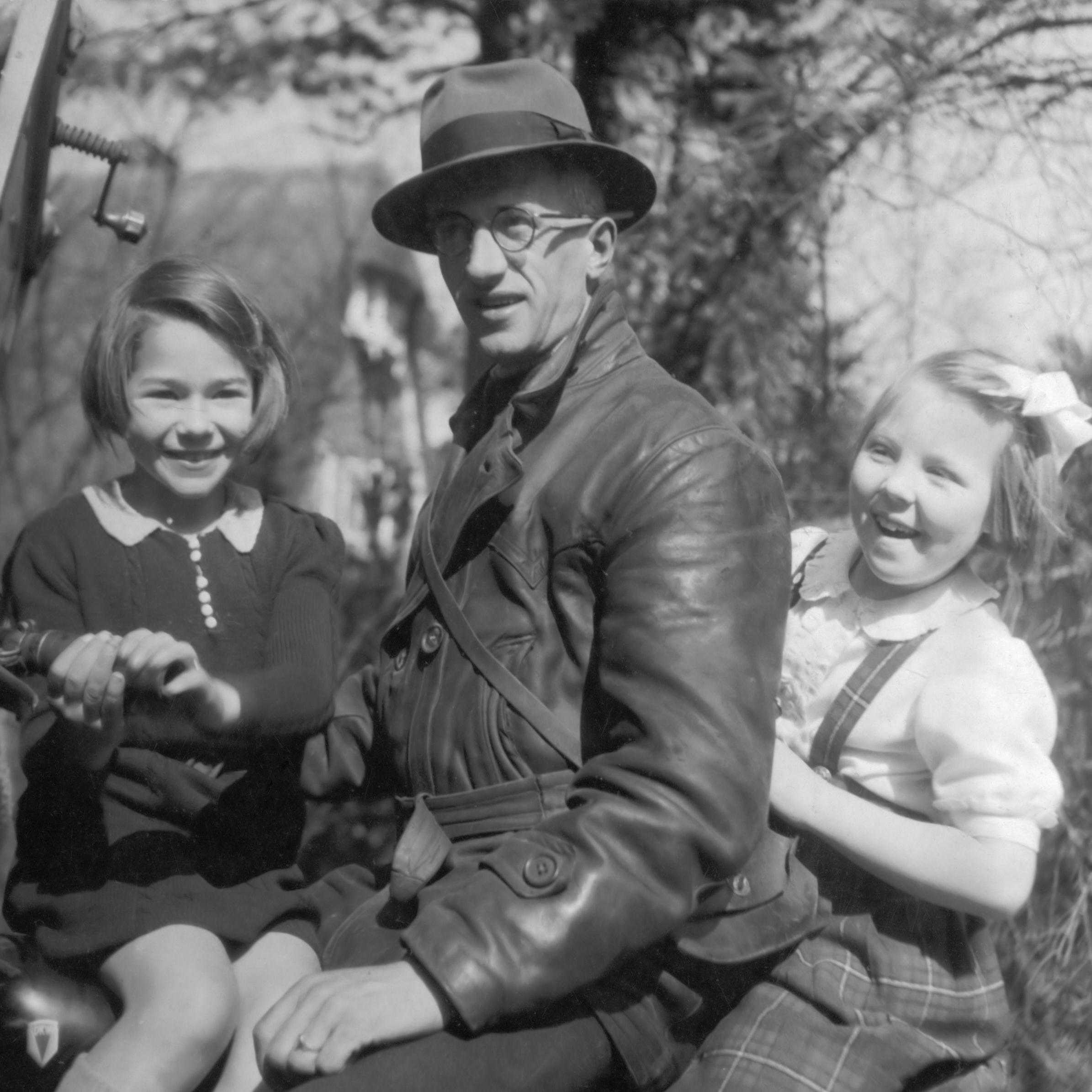
Kees Boeke with Beatrix of the Netherlands (right) in 1946

His school, which uses Maria Montessori's methods, extended by Boeke's own educational ideas, became nationally known; even the Dutch queen Juliana sent her daughters there. The school has been hugely influential for its creative way of making the students co-responsible for their own curriculum, together with the teachers; many students who failed in regular schools have blossomed at "De werkplaats", but on the other hand many talented children could not reach a high level in this school.

Co-responsibility in school did not mean a freewheeling life at "the Werkplaats". Children had to perform tasks such as cleaning the school, growing vegetables and fruits, and helping with lunch cooking. Boeke's notion of sociocracy was, in effect, a secular implementation of the Quaker ideals applied to education in such a way that children were treated as adults, and were on first-name terms with their teachers.

In WWII, Kees and Betty sheltered Jews at their own peril, saving several lives. For this work, they were enshrined in Yad Vashem in 1992.

Boeke wrote a major book on education. One of his last works was Cosmic View (New York 1957).

On 3 July 1966, Boeke died in the company of his family in Abcoude, Netherlands.

== Legacy ==
Boeke's system of sociocracy still survives, and his work was expanded upon through the efforts of a well-known student of Boeke's ideas, Dr. Gerard Endenburg, who in the 1960s and 1970s developed a governance and decision-making methodology by the same name while directing the Endenburg Electrotechniek company.

Boeke's essay/book Cosmic View (1957) presents a seminal view of the universe, from the galactic to the microscopic scale. It inspired several films:

- Cosmic Zoom (1968) produced by the National Film Board of Canada
- Powers of Ten (1968; new version in 1977) by Charles and Ray Eames
- The IMAX film Cosmic Voyage (1996) produced for the Smithsonian Institution's National Air and Space Museum.
- Superpowers of Ten (2013), a theater piece produced by Andrés Jaque and performed at the Lisbon Triennial, the Chicago Architectural Biennial, Museo Jumex in Mexico and ZKM in Karlsruhe
- Cosmic View is mentioned as an inspiration by Will Wright, creator of a video game, Spore (2008).

== See also ==
- List of peace activists
