= Location of Earth =

Location of Earth in the Universe

Earth location
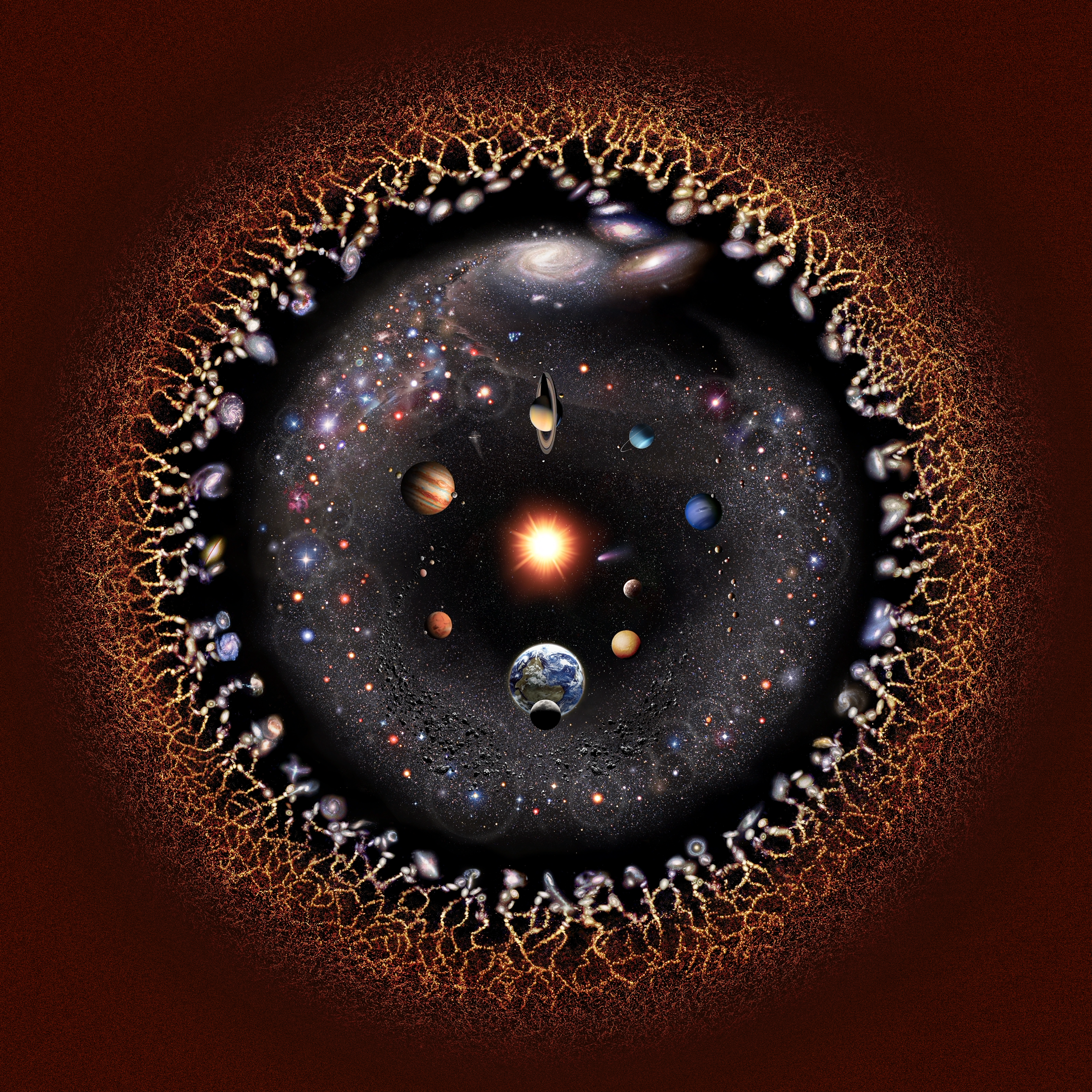
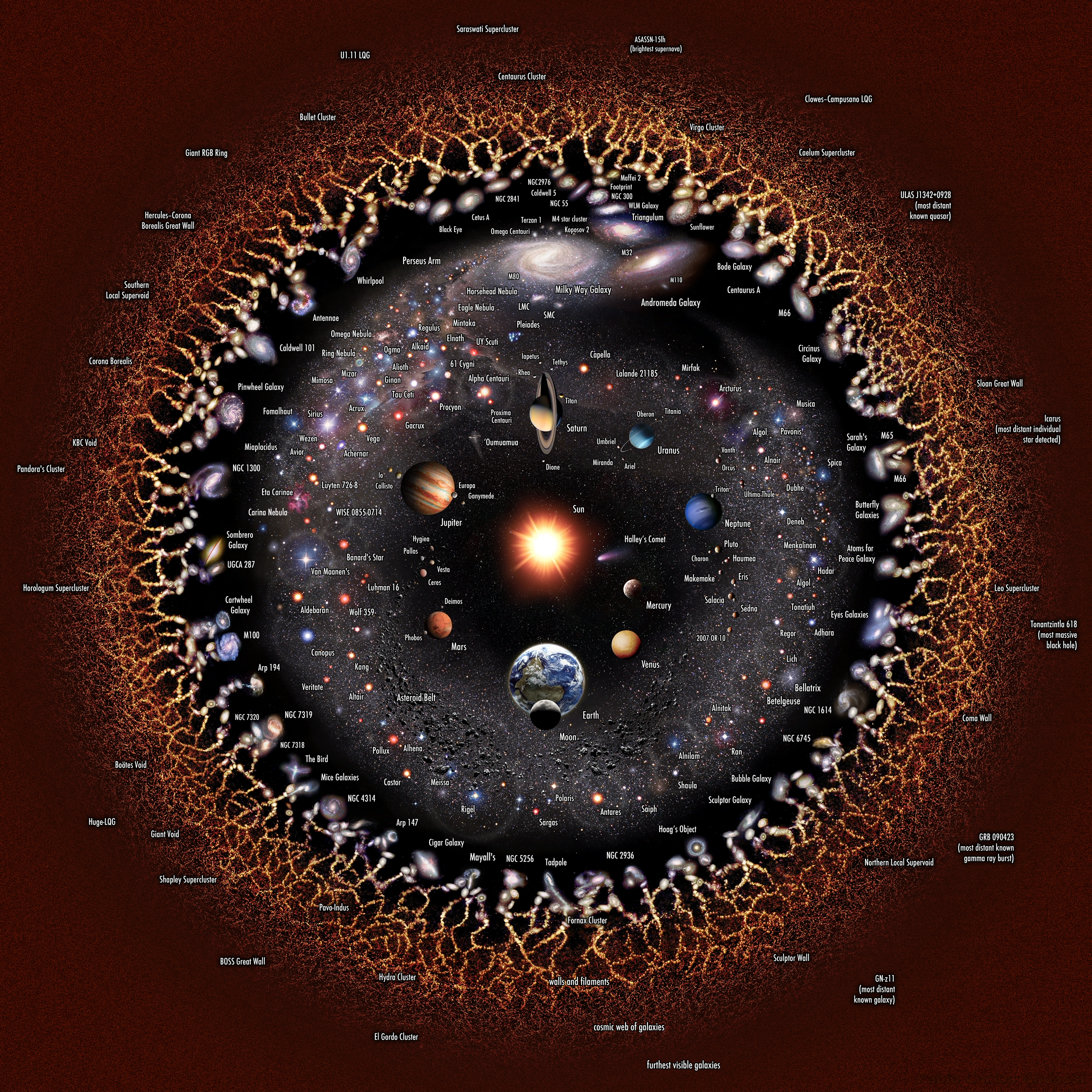
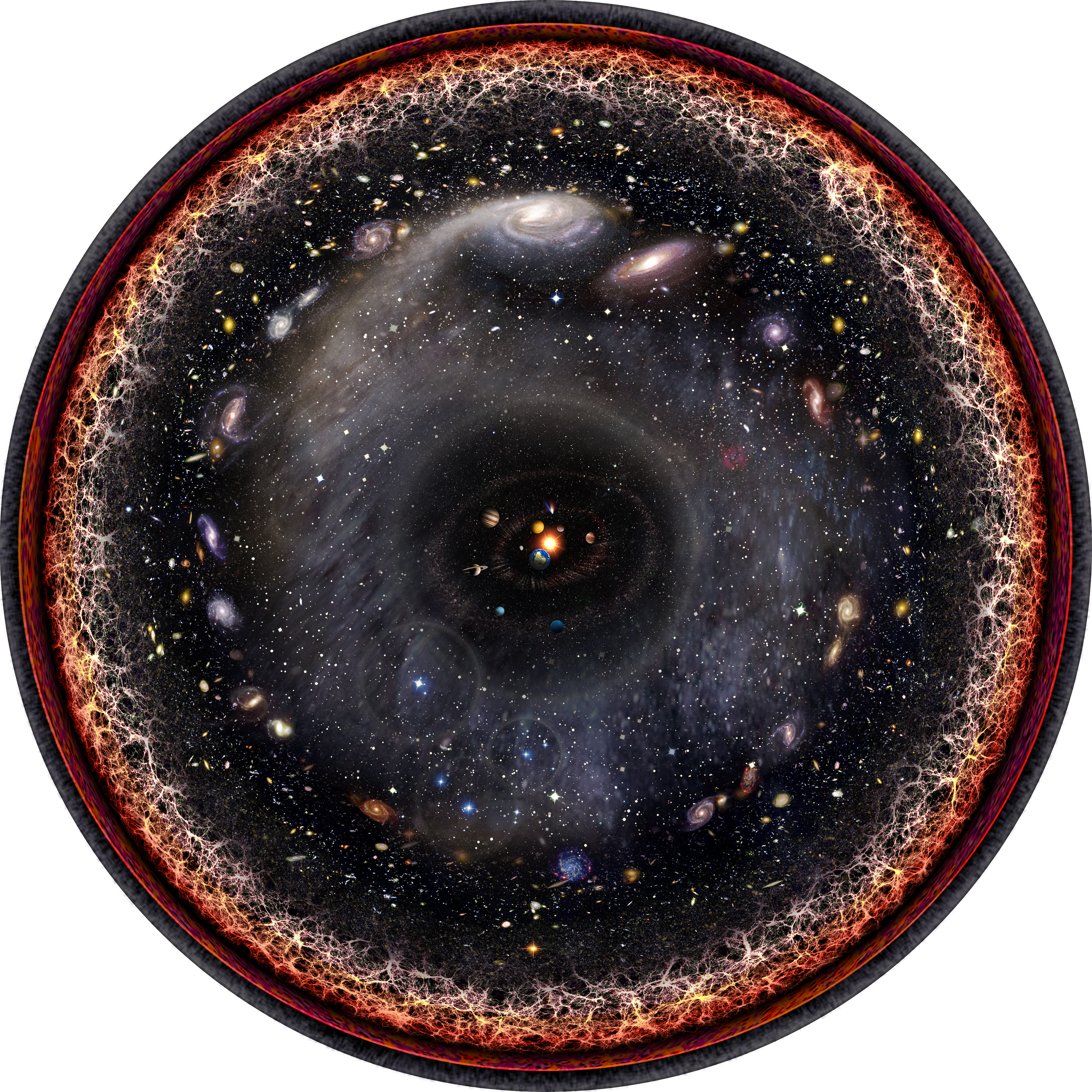
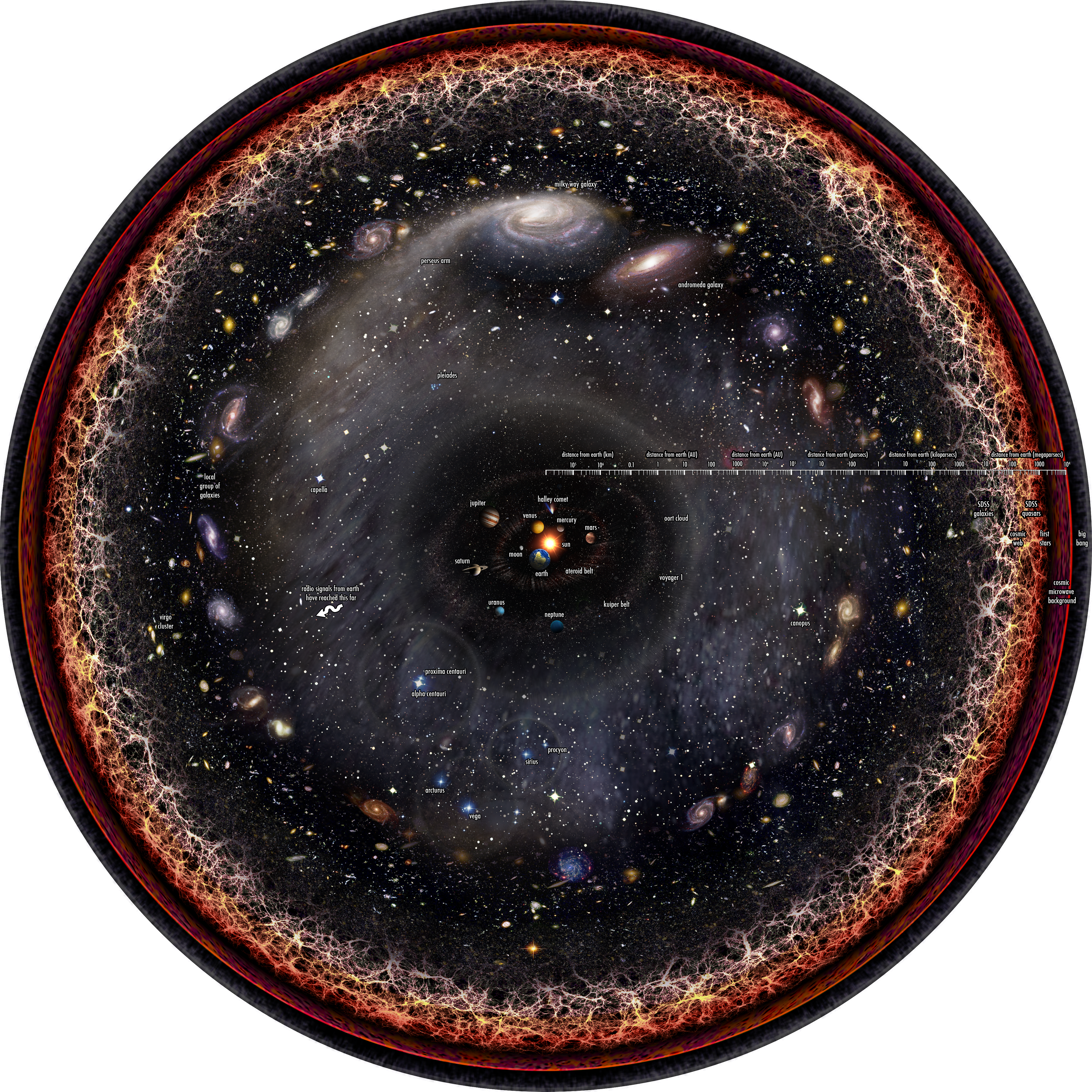
- Logarithmic representation of the universe centered on the Solar System. Celestial bodies on this graphic are clickable and shown with their sizes enlarged.

Knowledge of the location of Earth has been shaped by 400 years of telescopic observations, and has expanded radically since the start of the 20th century. Initially, Earth was believed to be the center of the Universe, which consisted only of those planets visible with the naked eye and an outlying sphere of fixed stars. After the acceptance of the heliocentric model in the 17th century, observations by William Herschel and others showed that the Sun lay within a vast, disc-shaped galaxy of stars. By the 20th century, observations of spiral nebulae revealed that the Milky Way galaxy was one of billions in an expanding universe, grouped into clusters and superclusters. By the end of the 20th century, the overall structure of the visible universe was becoming clearer, with superclusters forming into a vast web of filaments and voids. Superclusters, filaments and voids are the largest coherent structures in the Universe that we can observe. At still larger scales (over 1000 megaparsecs (Note: A parsec (pc) is the distance at which a star's parallax as viewed from Earth is equal to one second of arc, equal to roughly 206,000 AU or 3.0857×10^{13} km. One megaparsec (Mpc) is equivalent to one million parsecs.)) the Universe becomes homogeneous, meaning that all its parts have on average the same density, composition and structure.

Since there is believed to be no "center" or "edge" of the Universe, there is no particular reference point with which to plot the overall location of Earth in the universe. Because the observable universe is defined as that region of the Universe visible to terrestrial observers, Earth is, because of the constancy of the speed of light, the center of Earth's observable universe. Reference can be made to Earth's position with respect to specific structures, which exist at various scales. It is still undetermined whether the Universe is infinite. There have been numerous hypotheses that the known universe may be only one such example within a higher multiverse; however, no direct evidence of any sort of multiverse has been observed, and some have argued that the hypothesis is not falsifiable.

== Details ==
Earth is the third planet from the Sun with an approximate distance of 149.6 million kilometres (93.0 million miles), and is traveling nearly 2.1 million kilometres per hour (1.3 million miles per hour) through outer space.

== Table ==
Feature	Diameter		Notes	Sources
Feature	(most suitable unit)	(km, with scientific notation)	Notes	
Earth	12,756.2 km (equatorial)	1.28×10^{4}	Measurement comprises just the solid part of Earth; there is no agreed upper boundary for Earth's atmosphere. The geocorona, a layer of UV-luminescent hydrogen atoms, lies at 100,000 km. The Kármán line, defined as the boundary of space for astronautics, lies at 100 km.	
Orbit of the Moon	768,210 km (Note: Semi-major and semi-minor axes.)	7.68×10^{5}	The average diameter of the orbit of the Moon relative to Earth.	
Geospace	6,363,000–12,663,000 km (110–210 Earth radii)	6.36×10^{6}–1.27×10^{7}	The space dominated by Earth's magnetic field and its magnetotail, shaped by the solar wind.	
Earth's orbit	299.2 million km 2 AU (Note: 1 AU or astronomical unit is the distance between Earth and the Sun, or 150 million km. Earth's orbital diameter is twice its orbital radius, or 2 AU.)	2.99×10^{8}	The average diameter of the orbit of Earth relative to the Sun. Encompasses the Sun, Mercury and Venus.	
Inner Solar System	~6.54 AU	9.78×10^{8}	Encompasses the Sun, the inner planets (Mercury, Venus, Earth, Mars) and the asteroid belt. Cited distance is the 2:1 resonance with Jupiter, which marks the outer limit of the asteroid belt.	
Outer Solar System	60.14 AU	9.00×10^{9}	Includes the outer planets (Jupiter, Saturn, Uranus, Neptune). Cited distance is the orbital diameter of Neptune.	
Kuiper belt	~96 AU	1.44×10^{10}	Belt of icy objects surrounding the outer Solar System. Encompasses the dwarf planets Pluto, Haumea and Makemake. Cited distance is the 2:1 resonance with Neptune, generally regarded as the outer edge of the main Kuiper belt.	
Heliosphere	160 AU	2.39×10^{10}	Maximum extent of the solar wind and the interplanetary medium.	
Scattered disc	195.3 AU	2.92×10^{10}	Region of sparsely scattered icy objects surrounding the Kuiper belt. Encompasses the dwarf planet Eris. Cited distance is derived by doubling the aphelion of Eris, the farthest known scattered disc object. As of now, Eris's aphelion marks the farthest known point in the scattered disc.	
Oort cloud	100,000–200,000 AU; 0.613–1.23 pc	1.89×10^{13}–3.80×10^{13}	Spherical shell of over a trillion (10^{12}) comets. Existence is currently hypothetical, but inferred from the orbits of long-period comets.	
Solar System	1.23 pc	3.80×10^{13}	The Sun and its planetary system. Cited diameter is that of the Sun's Hill sphere; the region of its gravitational influence.	
Local Interstellar Cloud	9.2 pc	2.84×10^{14}	Interstellar cloud of gas through which the Sun and a number of other stars are currently traveling.	
Local Bubble	2.82–250 pc	8.70×10^{13}–7.71×10^{15}	Cavity in the interstellar medium in which the Sun and a number of other stars are currently traveling. Caused by a past supernova.	
Radcliffe wave	2,700 pc	8.33×10^{16}	Gaseous structure running parallel to the Milky Way's arms which contains several regions of star formation. It overlaps with the Gould Belt.	
Orion Arm	6,100 pc (length)	1.88×10^{17}	The spiral arm of the Milky Way Galaxy through which the Sun is currently travelling.	
Orbit of the Solar System	17,200 pc	5.31×10^{17}	The average diameter of the orbit of the Solar System relative to the Galactic Center. The Sun's orbital radius is roughly 8,600 parsecs, or slightly over halfway to the galactic edge. One orbital period of the Solar System lasts between 225 and 250 million years.	
Milky Way Galaxy	30,000 pc	9.26×10^{17}	Earth's home galaxy, composed of 200 billion to 400 billion stars and filled with the interstellar medium.	
Milky Way subgroup	840,500 pc	2.59×10^{19}	The Milky Way and those satellite dwarf galaxies gravitationally bound to it. Examples include the Sagittarius Dwarf, the Ursa Minor Dwarf and the Canis Major Dwarf. Cited distance is the orbital diameter of the Leo T Dwarf galaxy, the most distant galaxy in the Milky Way subgroup. Currently 59 satellite galaxies are part of the subgroup.	
Local Group	3 Mpc	9.26×10^{19}	Group of at least 80 galaxies of which the Milky Way is a part. Dominated by Andromeda (the largest), the Milky Way and Triangulum; the remainder are dwarf galaxies.	
Local Sheet	7 Mpc	2.16×10^{20}	Group of galaxies including the Local Group moving at the same relative velocity towards the Virgo Cluster and away from the Local Void.	
Virgo Supercluster	30 Mpc	9.26×10^{20}	The supercluster of which the Local Group is a part. It comprises roughly 100 galaxy groups and clusters, centred on the Virgo Cluster. The Local Group is located on the outer edge of the Virgo Supercluster.	
Laniakea Supercluster	160 Mpc	4.94×10^{21}	A group connected with the superclusters of which the Local Group is a part. Comprises roughly 300 to 500 galaxy groups and clusters, centred on the Great Attractor in the Hydra–Centaurus Supercluster.	
Pisces–Cetus Supercluster Complex	330 Mpc	1×10^{22}	Galaxy filament that includes the Pisces-Cetus Superclusters, Perseus–Pisces Supercluster, Sculptor Supercluster and associated smaller filamentary chains.	
Observable Universe	28,500 Mpc	8.79×10^{23}	At least 2 trillion galaxies in the observable universe, arranged in millions of superclusters, galactic filaments, and voids, creating a foam-like superstructure.	
Universe	≫28,500 Mpc (possibly infinite)	≫8.79×10^{23}	Beyond the observable universe lie the unobservable regions from which no light has yet reached Earth. No information is available, as light is the fastest travelling medium of information. However, uniformitarianism argues that the Universe is likely to contain more galaxies in the same foam-like superstructure.	

== Gallery ==
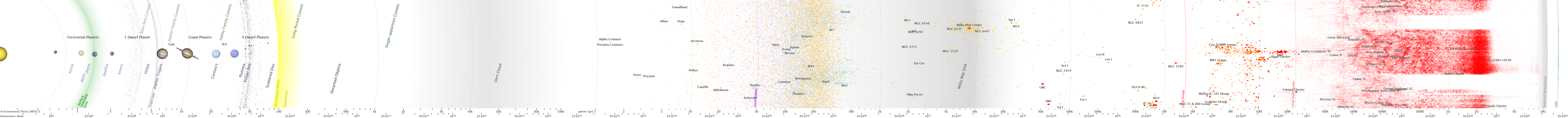
Logarithmic depiction of Earth's location
Location of Earth in the Universe

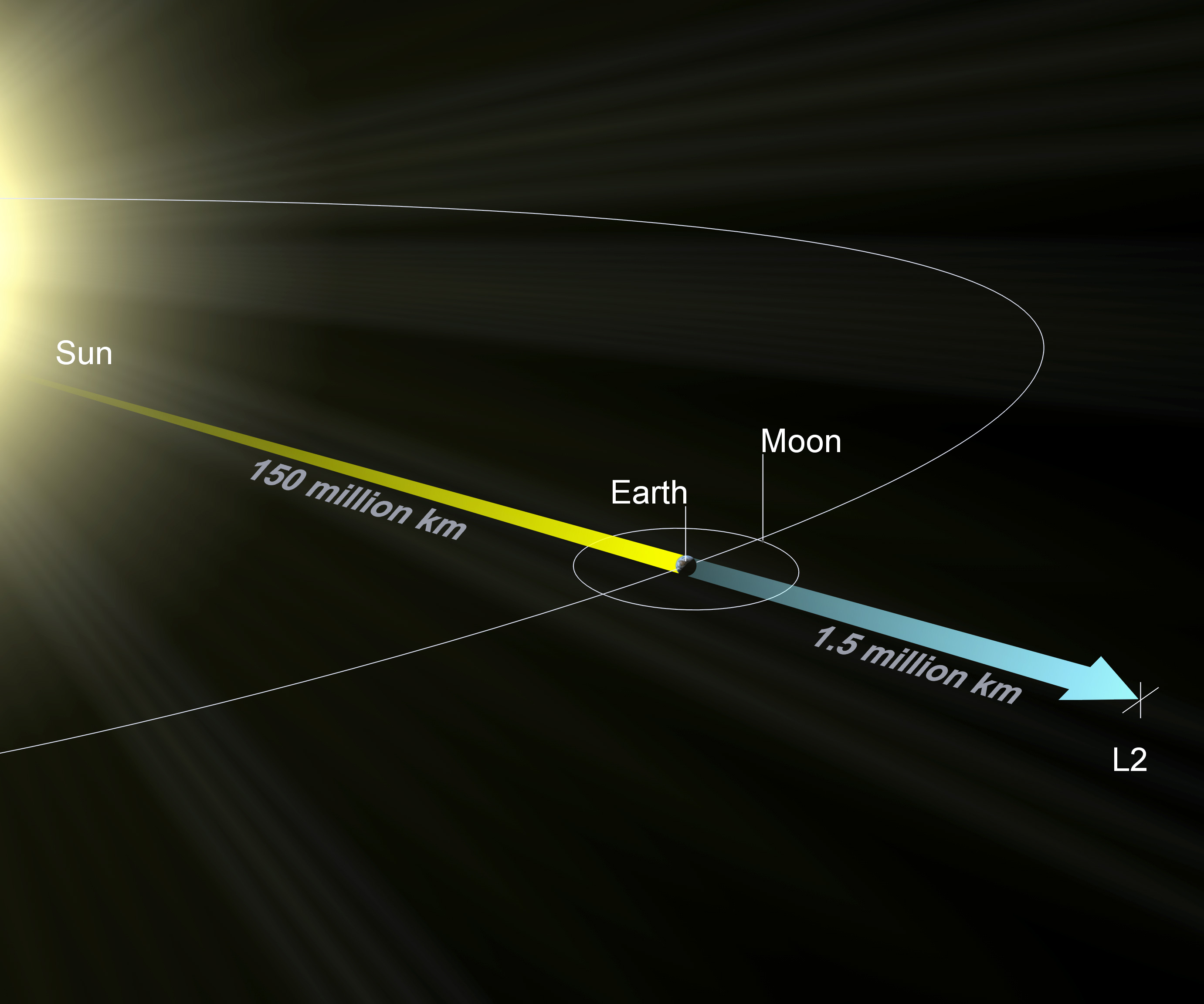
Earth-Moon System

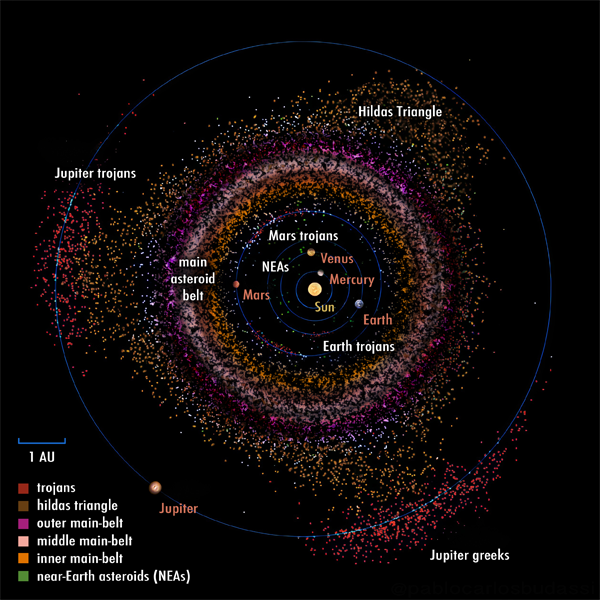
Inner Solar System with Near-Earth objects

Solar System and Oort cloud

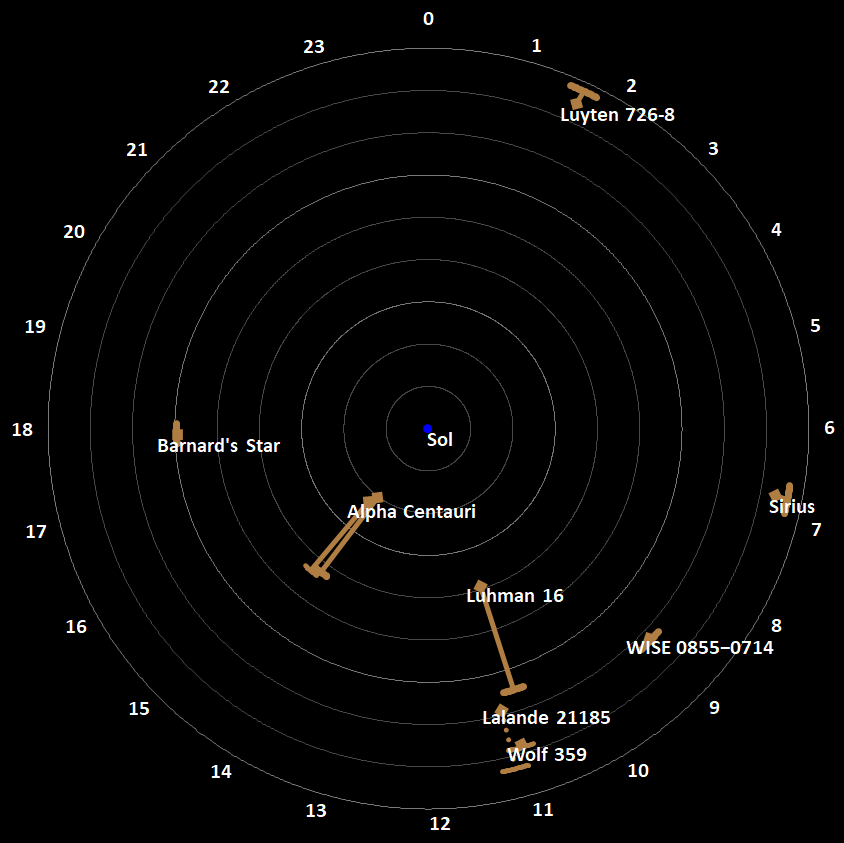
Nearest stars

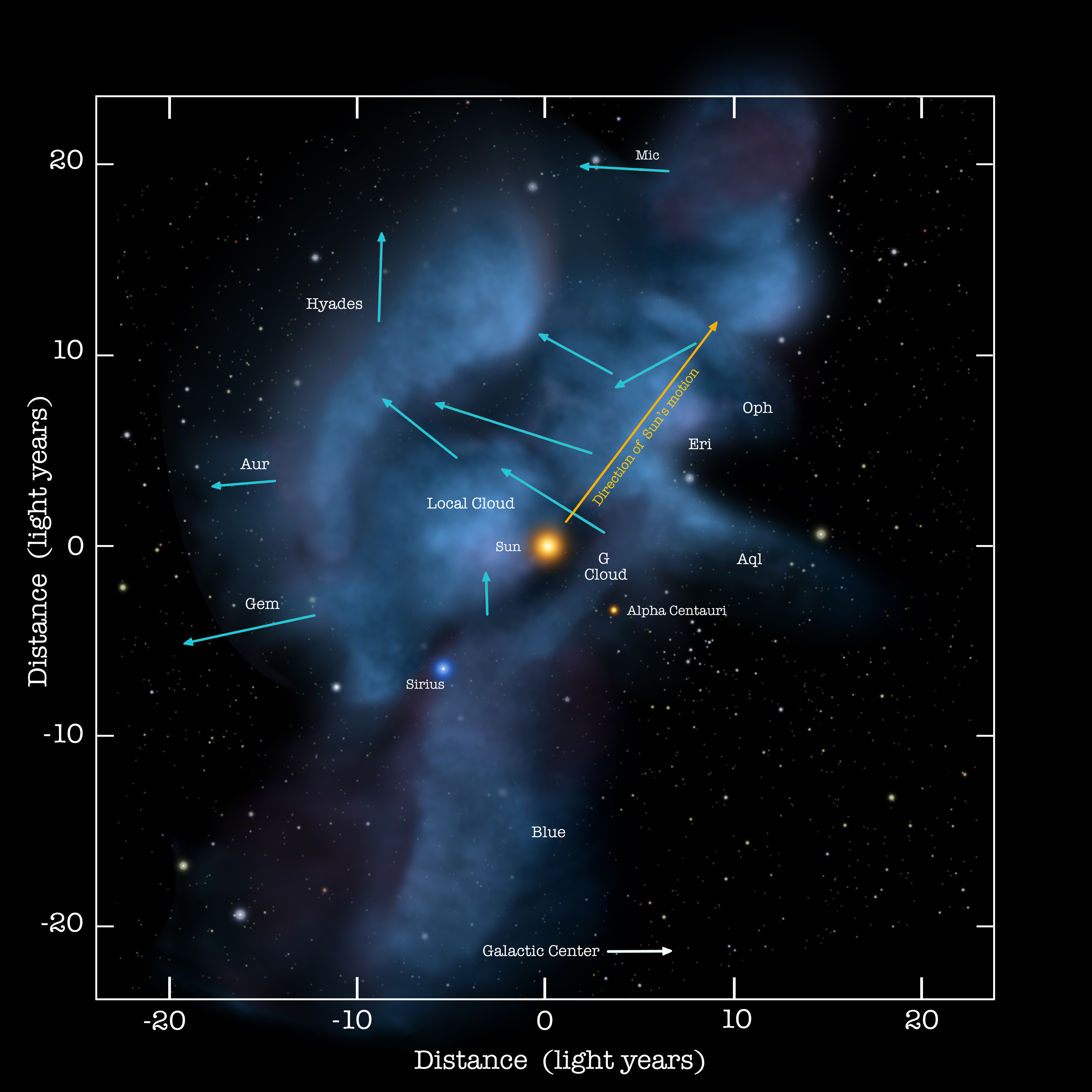
Local Interstellar Cloud and neighbouring interstellar medium

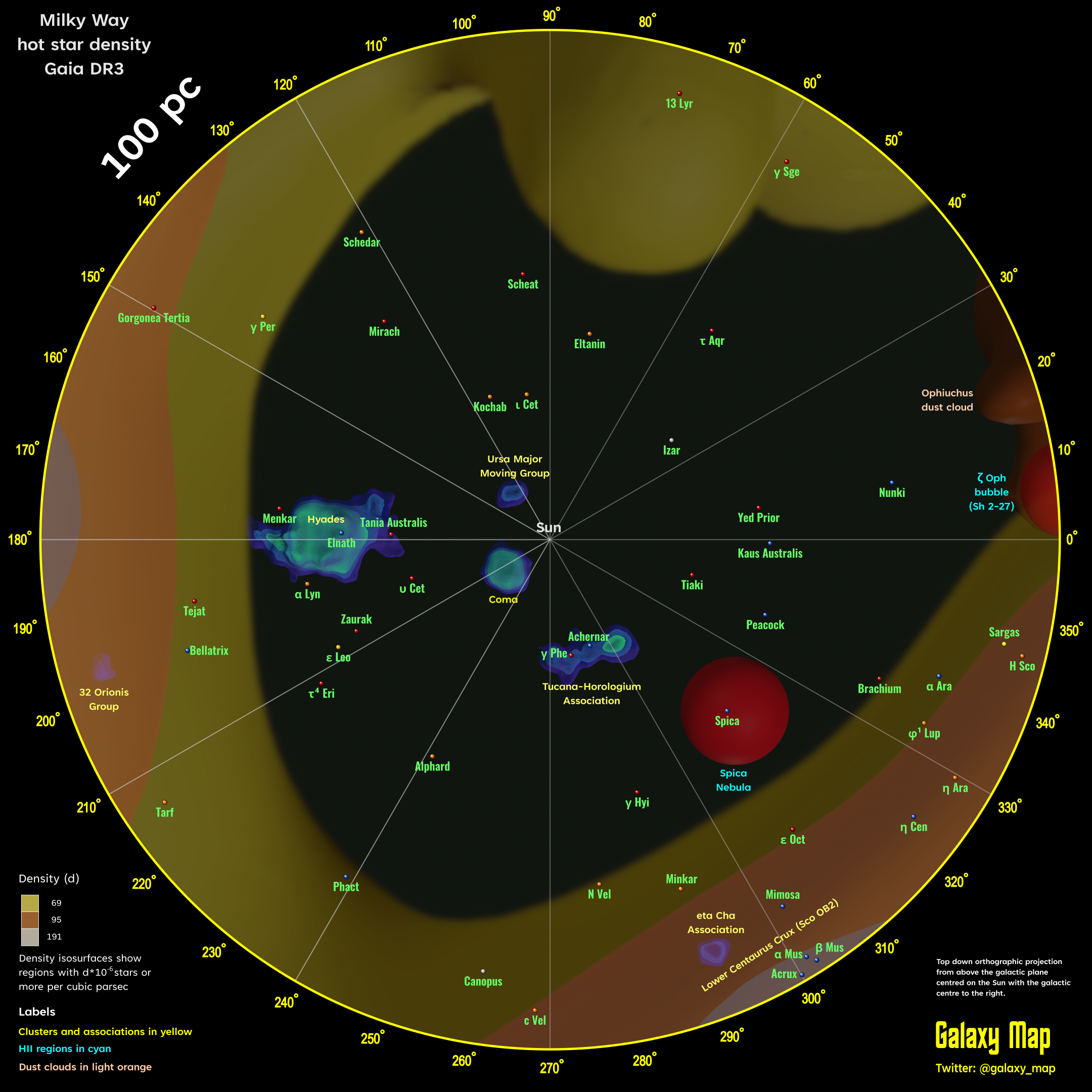
Star associations and interstellar medium map of the Local Bubble

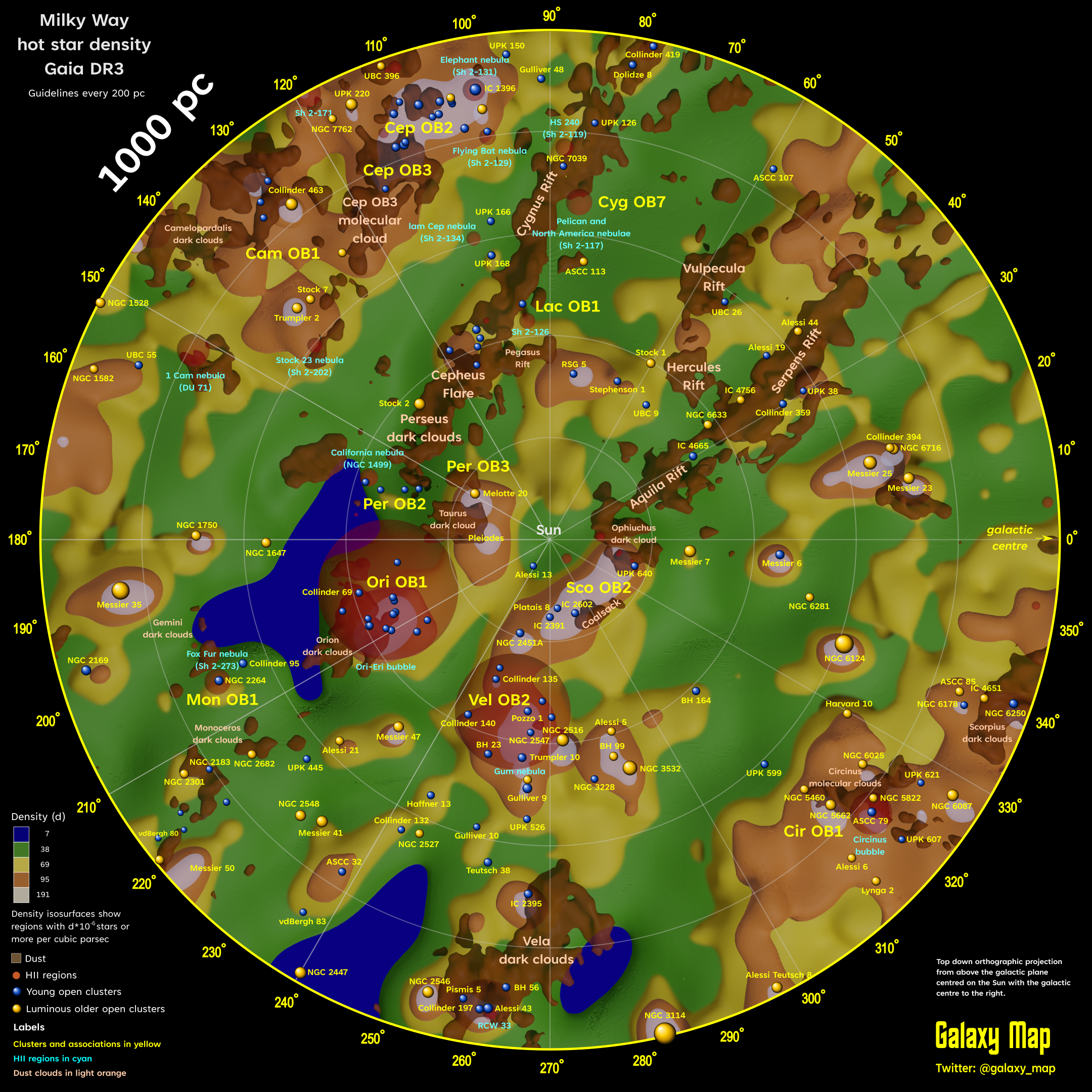
Molecular clouds around the Sun inside the Orion-Cygnus Arm

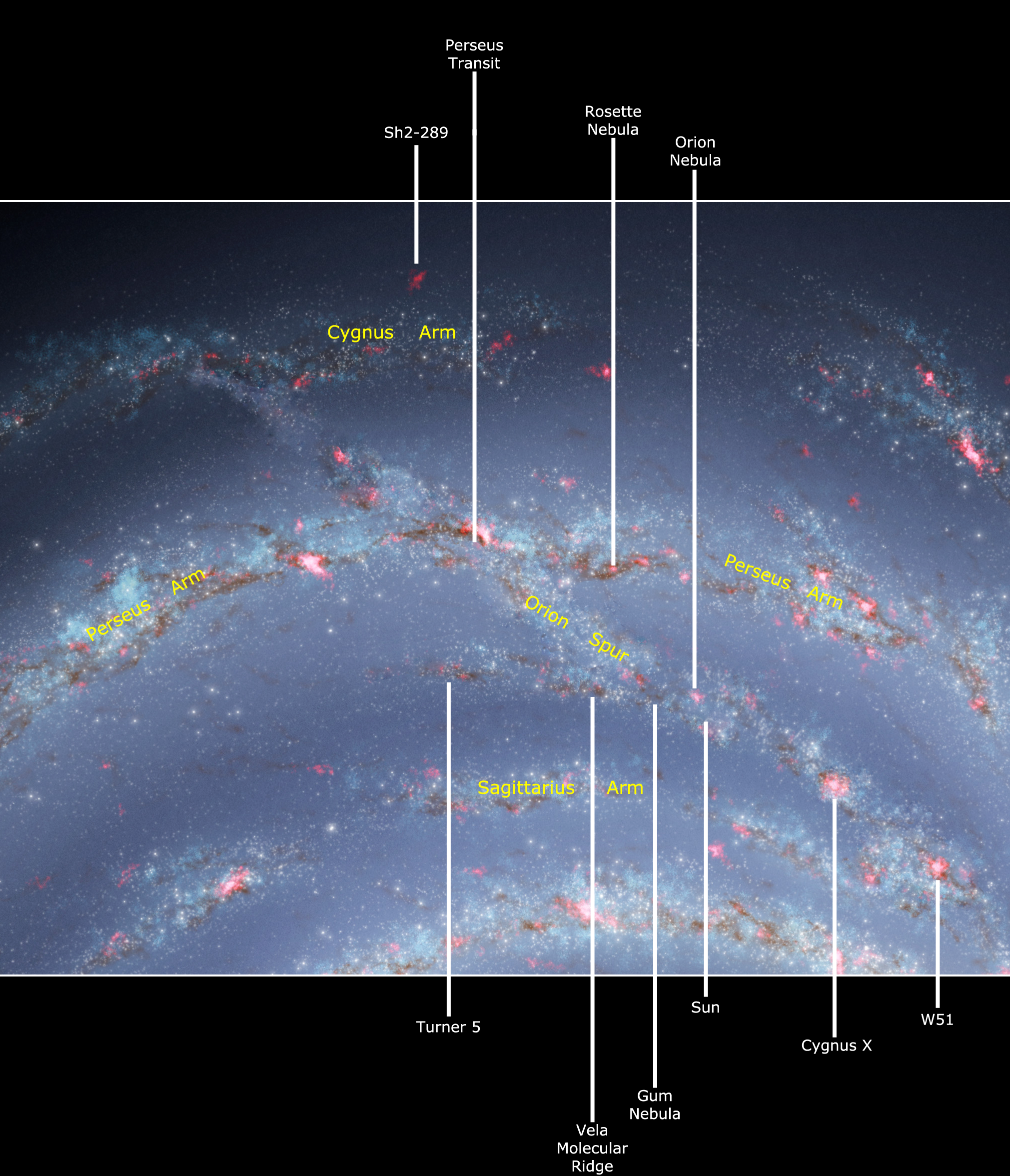
Orion-Cygnus Arm and neighbouring arms

Orion-Cygnus Arm inside the Milky Way

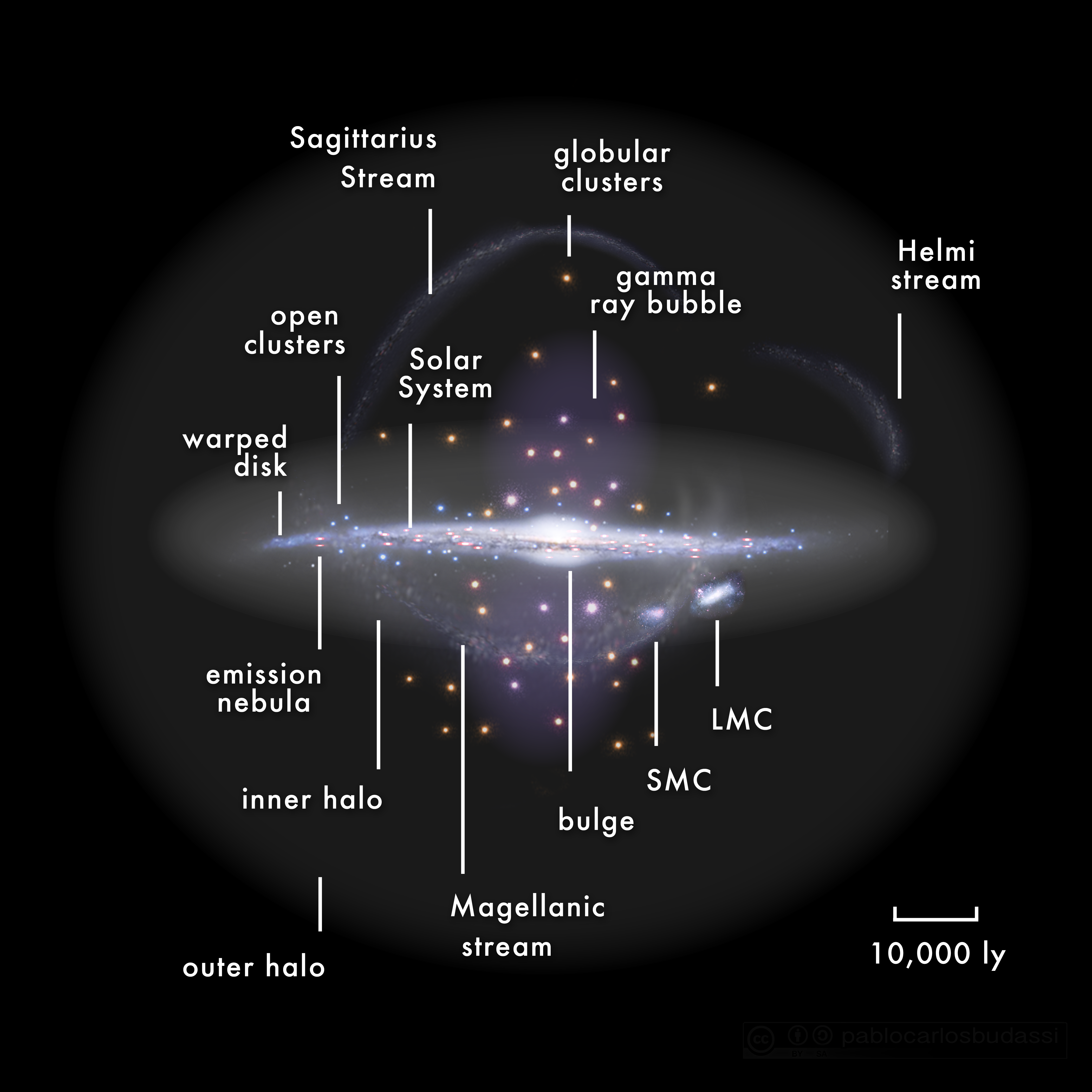
The Sun within the structure of the Milky Way

Satellite galaxies of the Milky Way in Local Group

Virgo SCl in Laniakea SCl

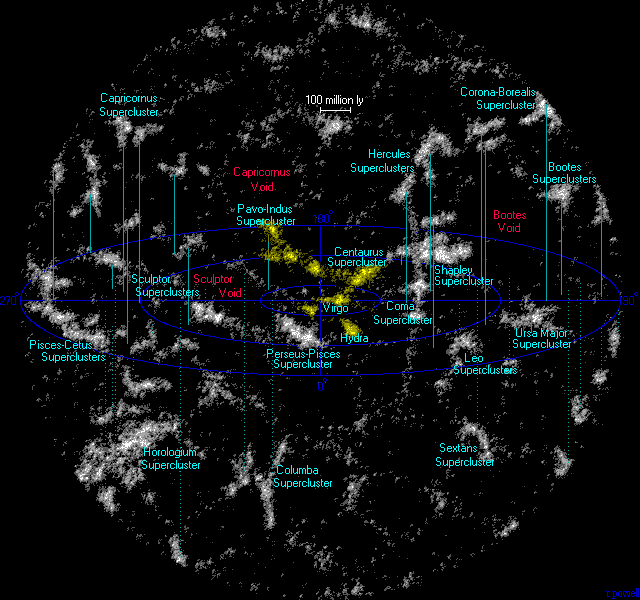
Laniakea SCl in Pisces–Cetus Supercluster Complex

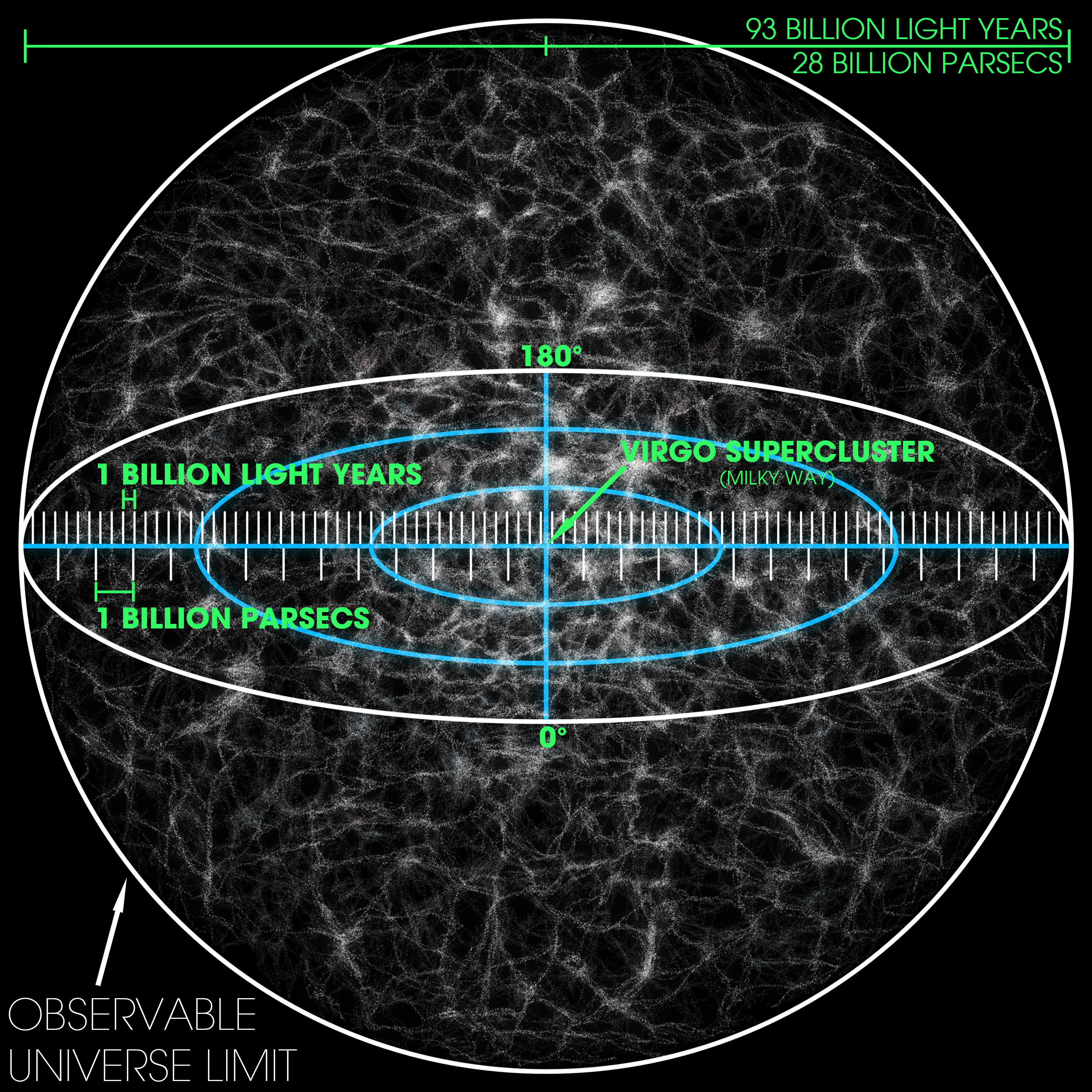
Observable Universe of the Universe

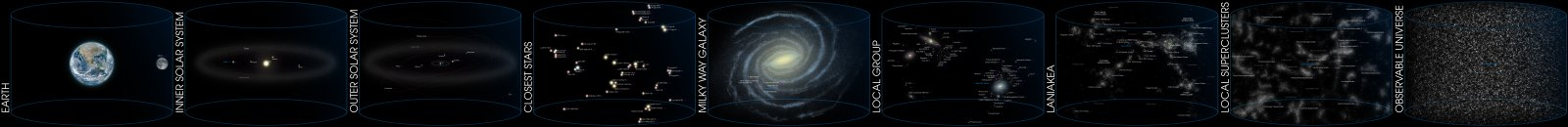
Clickable image of the location of Earth. Place the mouse cursor over an area in the image to see the related area name; click to link to an article about the area.

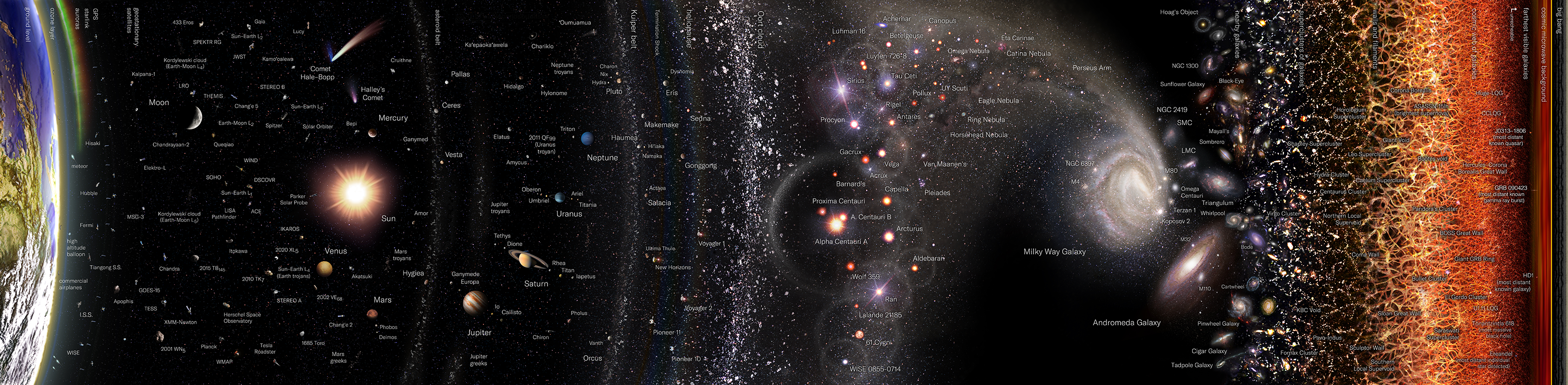
A logarithmic map of the observable universe. From left to right, spacecraft and celestial bodies are arranged according to their proximity to Earth.

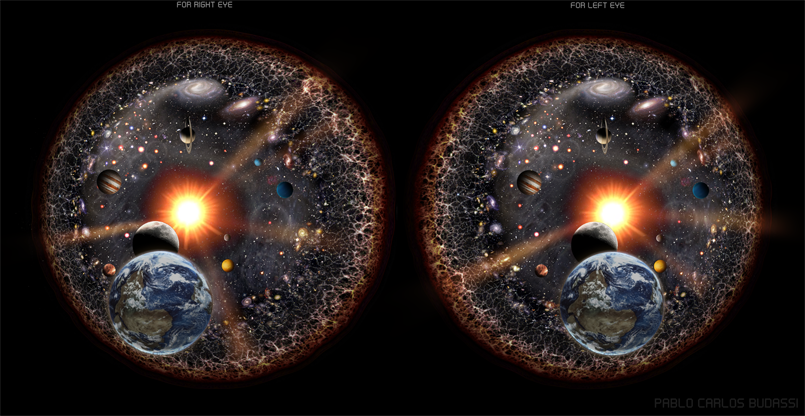
Stereoscopic view of the universe (805 x 416) for cross-eyed viewing

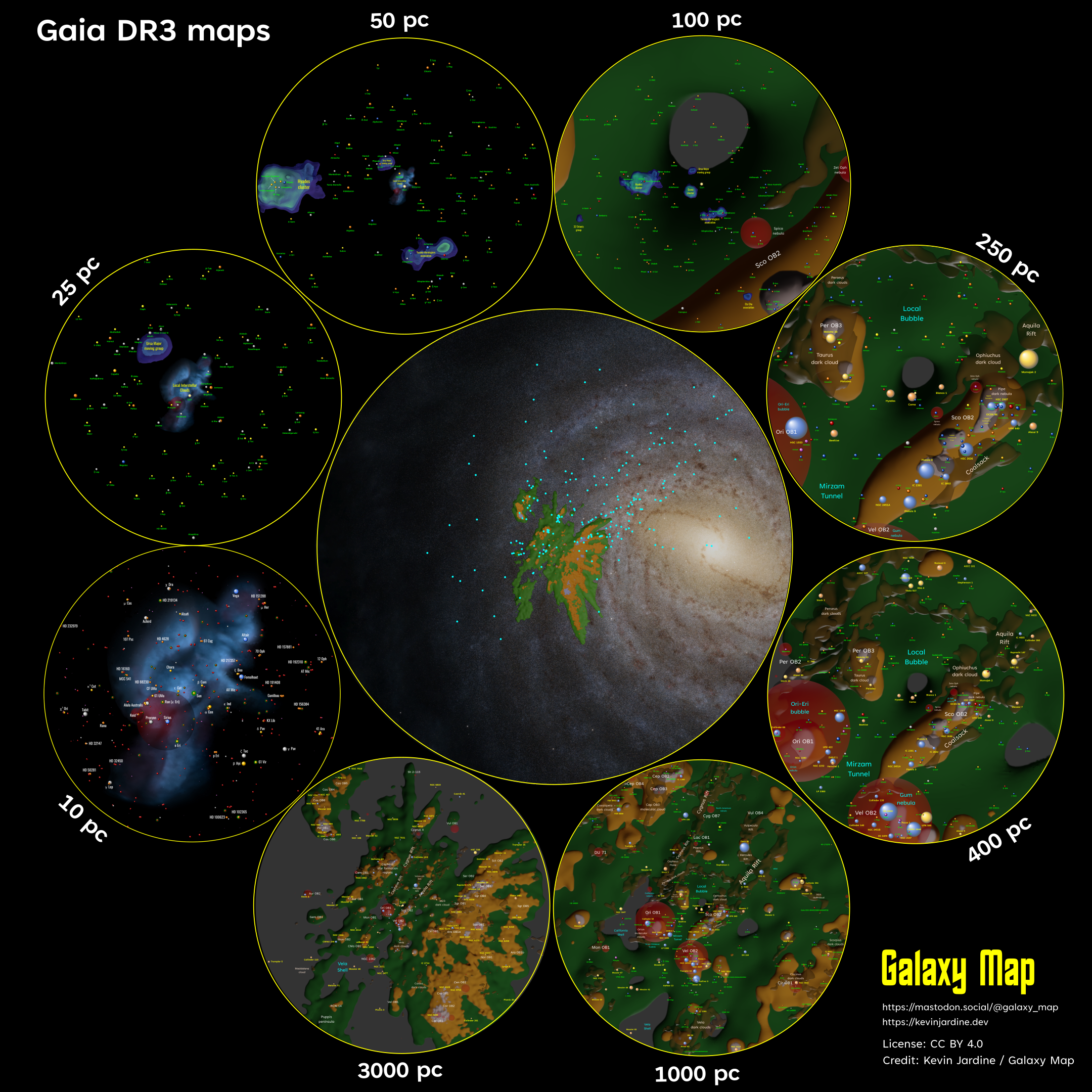
Gaia DR3 maps

== See also ==
- Cosmic View
- Cosmic Zoom
- "Galaxy Song"
- Center of the universe
- Orders of magnitude (length)
- Pale Blue Dot
- Powers of Ten (film)
- List of nearest stars and brown dwarfs
- Solar System § Galactic context
