= Philip Morrison =

American astrophysicist (1915–2005)

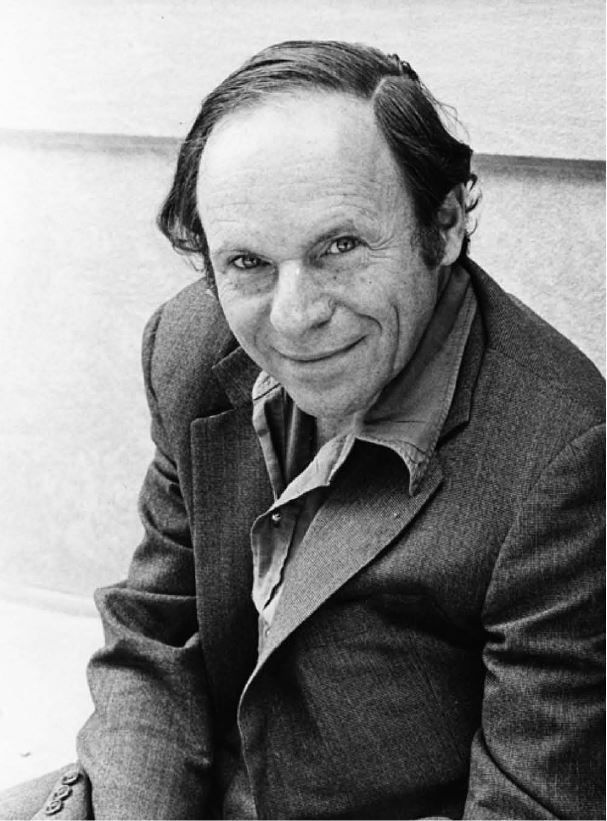
- Morrison in 1976
- Born: November 7, 1915; Somerville, New Jersey, U.S.
- Died: April 22, 2005 (aged 89); Cambridge, Massachusetts, U.S.
- Education: Carnegie Mellon University (BS); University of California, Berkeley (MS, PhD)
- Known for: Manhattan Project, SETI, science education
- Spouses: Emily Kramer (m. 1938; div. 1961) Phylis Hagen (m. 1965; died 2002)
- Awards: See #Recognition
- Scientific career
- Fields: Astrophysics
- Workplaces: San Francisco State University; University of Illinois at Urbana–Champaign; Manhattan Project; Cornell University; Massachusetts Institute of Technology
- Thesis: Three Problems in Atomic Electrodynamics (1940)
- Doctoral advisor: J. Robert Oppenheimer
- Doctoral students: Hong-Yee Chiu

Philip Morrison (November 7, 1915 – April 22, 2005) was an American professor of physics at the Massachusetts Institute of Technology (MIT). He is known for his work on the Manhattan Project during World War II, and for his later work in quantum physics, nuclear physics, high energy astrophysics, and SETI.

A graduate of Carnegie Tech, Morrison became interested in physics, which he studied at the University of California, Berkeley, under the supervision of J. Robert Oppenheimer. He also joined the Communist Party. During World War II he joined the Manhattan Project's Metallurgical Laboratory at the University of Chicago, where he worked with Eugene Wigner on the design of nuclear reactors.

In 1944 he moved to the Manhattan Project's Los Alamos Laboratory in New Mexico, where he worked with George Kistiakowsky on the development of explosive lenses required to detonate the implosion-type nuclear weapon. Morrison transported the core of the Trinity test device to the test site in the back seat of a Dodge sedan. As leader of Project Alberta's pit crew he helped load the atomic bombs on board the aircraft that participated in the atomic bombing of Hiroshima and Nagasaki. After the war ended, he traveled to Hiroshima as part of the Manhattan Project's mission to assess the damage.

After the war he became a champion of nuclear nonproliferation. He wrote for the Bulletin of the Atomic Scientists, and helped found the Federation of American Scientists and the Institute for Defense and Disarmament Studies. He was one of the few ex-communists to remain employed and academically active throughout the 1950s, but his research turned away from nuclear physics towards astrophysics. He published papers on cosmic rays, and a 1958 paper of his is considered to mark the birth of gamma ray astronomy. He was also known for writing popular science books and articles, and appearing in television programs.

== Early life and education ==
Philip Morrison was born in Somerville, New Jersey, November 7, 1915, the only son of Moses Morrison and Tillie Rosenbloom. He had a younger sister, Gail. The family moved to Pittsburgh when he was two. He contracted polio when he was four, and as a result wore a caliper on one leg, and spent his last years in a wheelchair. Because of his polio, Morrison did not commence school until the third grade.

On graduating from high school he entered Carnegie Tech, planning to major in electrical engineering. While there he became interested in physics. He earned his Bachelor of Science (B.S.) in 1936. He then entered the University of California, Berkeley, where he earned his PhD in theoretical physics in 1940 under the supervision of J. Robert Oppenheimer, writing his thesis on "Three Problems in Atomic Electrodynamics".

In 1938, Morrison married Emily Kramer, a girl he had known in high school, and a fellow Carnegie Tech graduate. They divorced in 1961. In 1965 he married Phylis Hagen. They remained together until Phylis died in 2002.

== Manhattan Project ==
After he finished his Ph.D. Morrison took a position as an instructor at San Francisco State College. In 1941 he became an instructor at the University of Illinois. In December 1942, with World War II raging around the globe, he was recruited by Robert F. Christy to join the Manhattan Project's Metallurgical Laboratory at the University of Chicago in January 1943. There he worked with Eugene Wigner on the design of nuclear reactors.

Concerned about the danger from the German nuclear energy project, Morrison helped persuade the director of the Manhattan Project, Brigadier General Leslie R. Groves, Jr., to initiate the Alsos Mission in order to gather information on it.

With the work in Chicago winding down in mid-1944, Morrison moved to the Manhattan Project's Los Alamos Laboratory in New Mexico as a group leader. His first task was to help determine how much plutonium a bomb would require. He calculated that 6 kilograms (13 lb) would be sufficient. He then worked with George Kistiakowsky on the explosive lenses required to detonate the implosion-type nuclear weapon.

Morrison transported the core of the Trinity test gadget to the test site in the back seat of a Dodge sedan. He was an eyewitness to the test on July 16, 1945, and wrote a report on it. A month later, as leader of Project Alberta's pit crew, he helped load the atomic bombs on board the aircraft that participated in the atomic bombing of Hiroshima and Nagasaki. After the war ended, Morrison and Robert Serber traveled to Hiroshima as part of the Manhattan Project's mission to assess the damage.

== Activism ==
Morrison returned to Los Alamos, where he remained until 1946. He turned down an offer from Ernest O. Lawrence to return to Berkeley, and instead accepted an invitation from Hans Bethe to join him at the physics faculty at Cornell University.

After surveying the destruction left by the use of the atom bomb in Hiroshima, Morrison became a champion of nuclear nonproliferation. He wrote for the Bulletin of the Atomic Scientists, and helped found the Federation of American Scientists and the Institute for Defense and Disarmament Studies. He testified before Congress on the need for civilian control of nuclear energy, and participated in the Civil Rights Congress in New York and the Cultural and Scientific Conference for World Peace in 1949. That year, Life magazine included his image in a gallery of "America's 50 most eminent dupes and fellow travellers".

Morrison had joined the Communist Party while he was at Berkeley. The House Un-American Activities Committee devoted four pages of a 1951 report to his activities, and in 1953, he was called before the Senate Internal Security Subcommittee. Theodore Paul Wright, the Acting President of Cornell, was put under great pressure from board members and alumni to fire Morrison, but Bethe remained supportive, and Robert R. Wilson declared that Morrison had "demonstrated his patriotism by the distinguished role he played in the wartime development of the atomic bomb."

Deane Malott, who became president of Cornell in 1951, was much less sympathetic, and instructed Morrison to curtail all activities beyond his academic field. Morrison agreed to do so in 1954. He was one of the few ex-communists to remain employed and academically active throughout the 1950s.

In 1999, writer Jeremy Stone alleged that Morrison had been the Soviet spy Perseus, a charge that Morrison strongly and credibly rebutted. Stone accepted his rebuttal.

== Academic work ==
Pulse of gamma rays from the Vela Pulsar as constructed from photons detected by Fermi's Large Area Telescope

Morrison co-wrote a paper with Leonard I. Schiff in 1940 in which they calculated the gamma rays emitted by the process of K-electron capture. Initially at Cornell after the war, Morrison continued working in nuclear physics, collaborating with Bethe on a textbook, Elementary Nuclear Theory (1952), one of the early treatments of the relatively new field.

In 1954, Morrison published a paper with Bruno Rossi and Stanislaw Olbert in which they explored Enrico Fermi's theory of how cosmic rays travel through the galaxy. Morrison followed this up with a review of theories of the origins of cosmic rays in 1957. A 1958 paper in Nuovo Cimento is considered to mark the birth of gamma ray astronomy.

In collaboration with Giuseppe Cocconi, Morrison published a paper in 1959 proposing the potential of microwaves in the search for interstellar communications, a component of the modern SETI program. This was one of the first proposals for detecting extraterrestrial intelligence. He conceded that "The probability of success is difficult to estimate, but if we never search, the chance of success is zero."

Morrison remained at Cornell until 1964, when he went to the Massachusetts Institute of Technology (MIT). He remained there for the remainder of his career, becoming institute professor in 1976, and Institute Professor Emeritus in 1986. In 1963, working in collaboration with a student of his, James Felten, Morrison had investigated the effect of inverse Compton scattering, an important source of cosmic x-rays and gamma rays. At MIT, Morrison teamed up with Bruno Rossi's x-ray group there, and also with Riccardo Giacconi's group at nearby American Science and Engineering. Morrison became deeply involved in the exploration of the cosmos through its x-ray and gamma ray emissions. In a 1960 paper, he noted the similarities between pulsars and quasars. He returned to this in 1976, applying his model to the radio galaxy Cygnus A.

== Media work ==
Morrison is one of those discussing the likelihood of life on other planets in Who's Out There? (1973), an award-winning NASA documentary film by Robert Drew.

Morrison was known for his numerous books and television programs. He produced 68 popular science articles between 1949 and 1976, ten in issues of Scientific American. He provided the narration and script for Powers of Ten in 1977. With his wife, Phylis, they turned the same material into a coffee table book in 1982. He also appeared as himself in the science documentary film Target...Earth? in 1980. In 1987, PBS aired his six part miniseries, The Ring of Truth: An Inquiry into How We Know What We Know, which he also hosted. In addition, he was a columnist and reviewer of books on science for Scientific American starting in 1965.

In later life he was a critic of the Strategic Defense Initiative. He authored or co-authored a number of books critical of the Cold War and the nuclear arms race, including Winding Down: The Price of Defense (1979), The Nuclear Almanac (1984), Reason Enough to Hope (1998) Beyond the Looking Glass (1993).

== Recognition ==
Morrison was a fellow of the American Physical Society, and chairman of the Federation of American Scientists from 1973 to 1976. He was also a member of the National Academy of Sciences, the International Astronomical Union, the American Association of Physics Teachers, the American Academy of Arts and Sciences and the American Philosophical Society.

Over his lifetime, Morrison received numerous honors and awards. He delivered the 1968 Royal Institution Christmas Lectures on Gulliver's Laws: The Physics of Large and Small, and the 1982 Jansky Lectureship before the National Radio Astronomy Observatory. He was awarded the Presidential Award and Pregel Prize of the New York Academy of Sciences, the Babson Prize of the Gravity Foundation, the American Association for the Advancement of Science's Westinghouse Science Writing Award, the American Association of Physics Teachers' Oersted Medal, the Dickinson College Priestly Medallion, Minnesota Museum of Science Public Science Medal, the American Institute of Physics' Andrew Gemant Award, the Astronomical Society of the Pacific's Klumpke-Roberts Award, the John P. McGovern Science and Society Award, the William Procter Prize for Scientific Achievement. and, with his wife Phylis, the Walker Prize by the Boston Museum of Science.

== Death ==
Morrison died in his sleep of a respiratory failure at his home in Cambridge, Massachusetts, on April 22, 2005. He was survived by his stepson Bert Singer.

== In popular culture ==
In the 2023 film Oppenheimer, directed by Christopher Nolan, Morrison was portrayed by actor Harrison Gilbertson.

== Bibliography ==
- Bethe, Hans A.; Morrison, Philip (1952). Elementary Nuclear Theory. New York: Wiley.
- Charles Babbage (with Emily Morrison) (1956)
- My Father’s Watch (with Donald Holcomb (Prentice Hall, 1974)
- Morrison, Philip; Morrison, Phylis (1982). Powers of Ten: a book about the relative size of things in the universe and the effect of adding another zero. Redding, Connecticut: Scientific American Library. Bibcode:1982ptba.book.....M.
- The Ring of Truth (with Phylis Morrison) (Random House, 1987)
- Nothing Is Too Wonderful to Be True (A Faraday dictum) (American Institute of Physics, 1994)
- Winding Down: The Price of Defense (Times Books, 1979)
- The Nuclear Almanac (Addison Wesley, 1984)
- Philip Morrison's Long Look at the Literature: His Reviews of a Hundred Memorable Science Books (ISBN 0-7167-2107-4 Freeman, 1990)
- Reason Enough to Hope (MIT Press, 1998)
- Beyond the Looking Glass (1993)
