= Cosmic View =

1957 book by Kees Boeke

Cosmic View: The Universe in 40 Jumps
- Author: Kees Boeke
- Language: Dutch (original)
- Genre: Non-fiction, Educational
- Publication date: 1957
- Publication place: Netherlands

Cosmic View: The Universe in 40 Jumps is a 1957 book by Dutch educator Kees Boeke that combines writing and graphics to explore many levels of size and structure, from the astronomically vast to the atomically tiny. The book begins with a photograph of a Dutch girl sitting outside a school and holding a cat. The text backs up from the original photo, with graphics that include more and more of the vast reaches of space in which the girl is located. It then narrows in on the original picture, with graphics that show ever smaller areas until the nucleus of a sodium atom is reached. Boeke writes commentary on each graphic, along with introductory and concluding notes.

== Summary and themes ==
In his introduction Boeke says the work originated with a school project at his Werkplaats Children's Community in Bilthoven. The idea was to draw pictures that would include ever-growing areas of space, to show how the Earth is located in an unfathomably enormous universe. Boeke then writes that he realized the reverse process—creating graphics of tinier and tinier bits of reality—would reveal a world "as full of marvels" as the most gigantic reaches of outer space.

The result is a voyage outward and inward from the familiar human scale. The ordinary photograph of a schoolgirl and a cat proves to be the starting point for an insightful visit to levels of reality that can only be imagined, and about which little may be known. In his conclusion Boeke speculates that the imaginary voyage depicted may help "just a little" to make mankind realize the enormousness of the cosmic powers that the human race has begun to master.

Boeke injected some humor into the book. He puts a blue whale into his graphics, incongruously lying alongside the girl and her cat, to give an idea of relative sizes. In his voyage into the smaller realms of reality, he includes an Anopheles mosquito that looks like a creature from a fifties science fiction film.

== Influence ==
Boeke's book attracted much attention and was included in Mortimer Adler's Gateway to the Great Books (1963) series. Many of the graphics are impressive realizations of the differences in size that lie hidden from our normal view. The graphics that show ever greater areas of the Earth, for instance, are interesting precursors to the satellite photos now available on the Internet.

Boeke's essay/book is recognized in the credits of three short documentary films:

- Cosmic Zoom (1968) produced by the National Film Board of Canada
- Powers of Ten (1968, re-released 1977) by Charles and Ray Eames
- The IMAX film Cosmic Voyage (1996) produced for the Smithsonian Institution's National Air and Space Museum.

It is also the basis of the interactive iOS app Cosmic Eye (2012), whose developer has also made a three-minute video from it, also called Cosmic Eye (2012, re-released 2018).

== See also ==
- Cosmic Zoom
- Earth's location in the universe
