= Ground Zero (campaign) =

American advocacy group

Ground Zero was a United States advocacy and education organization devoted to nuclear weapons. Founded by former White House National Security Council official Roger Molander, it did not explicitly support the nuclear freeze, but worked to raise awareness of the nuclear threat during the period of the freeze campaign in the early 1980s.

On March 21, 1982, Molander published a prominent piece in The Washington Post discussing the nuclear threat, and from April 18 to April 25, 1982 the organization sponsored a Ground Zero Week of nationwide events to demonstrate that American cities had no defenses in the event of nuclear war. These events were sponsored by the National Education Association, United Auto Workers, the National Council of Churches, and an array of other organizations. Some have suggested that these events helped build the momentum for the large freeze demonstration in New York City that took place on June 12, 1982.

Ground Zero also published a mass market paperback entitled Nuclear War: what's in it for you? Printed by Pocket Books of New York, the book included four scenarios "for killing 500 million people," statistics on the likely death totals of United States and Soviet Union nuclear exchanges and a layman's understanding of how nuclear weapons are designed and built.

== See also ==
- Firebreaks War/Peace Game
