= Roger Molander =

Roger Carl Molander (November 20, 1940 – March 25, 2012) was an American government official and activist.

== Life ==
Born in Perham, Minnesota, Molander grew up in Marinette, Wisconsin. He graduated with High Honors from University of Wisconsin–Madison with a degree in Mechanical Engineering with support from a Scott Paper Company scholarship. He received his doctorate in Engineering Science and Nuclear Engineering from University of California, Berkeley in 1967. From 1968 to 1981, Molander served in numerous government positions in the Arms Control and Disarmament Agency, Department of Defense, and the National Security Council (NSC) staff. He was an aide to Paul Nitze during the first Strategic Arms Limitation Talks (SALT I) and later while on the NSC staff served as Chairman of interagency Strategic Arms Limitation Treaty (SALT) Working Group with responsibility for preparing all of the analytic material in support of SALT II decision making. He also led studies on strategic nuclear policy and civil defense while at the NSC. In 1981, Molander left government service and formed Ground Zero, a nonpartisan education project on nuclear war geared to the American public and national and local media. Ground Zero organized a major week-long effort in April 1992, including activities in over 800 U.S. communities, Nightline special with worldwide hookups, and specials on the Today Show and Good Morning America. Ground Zero continued its nuclear war education programs for the next 5 years. From 1989 to 2012, Molander was employed as a Senior Research Scientist/Policy Analyst at the RAND Corporation, where he developed RAND's “Day After...” strategic planning exercise methodology to major national policy and strategy issues and other studies, leading teams focused on the U.S. response to nuclear terrorism and nuclear proliferation problems; homeland security challenges (including all aspects of chemical, biological, radiation and nuclear terrorism preparedness); the international security impact of the information technology (IT) revolution; and the terrorism threat to U.S. government continuity of operations. Molander died in Washington, D.C., in 2012 of complications relating to cholangiocarcinoma, a disease of the ducts in the liver.

== Legacy ==
The Earl and Roger Molander Scholarship Fund is awarded annually to a graduate from a Wisconsin public high school (preferably Marinette High School) to fund a semester of study in a chemical engineering or engineering program.
