= Institute for Defense and Disarmament Studies =

U.S.-based policy research and advocacy organization

The Institute for Defense and Disarmament Studies (IDDS) was a U.S.-based policy research and advocacy organization. Their website described them as "a nonprofit center where we study global military policies, arms holdings, production and trade, arms control and peace-building efforts; and run educational programs on current and alternative policies." IDDS was founded in 1980 by Director Dr. Randall Forsberg and was based in Brookline, Massachusetts. One of the founding members of the board was former Manhattan Project physicist Philip Morrison.

Upon untimely death of Randall Forsberg, Professor Judith Reppy, as chair of the IDDS board, assumed responsibility for the IDDS archive and facilitated it's transfer to the Cornell University Library.
