= Infectious Disease Detection and Surveillance =

US infectious disease prevention/detection agency from 2018 to 2023

The Infectious Disease Detection and Surveillance (IDDS) is a USAID project focused on preventing, detecting and monitoring infectious diseases. IDDS is run by ICF as well as other organizations such as FHI 360, PATH, Abt Associates, the African Society for Laboratory Medicine, the Association of Public Health Laboratories, Gryphon Scientific, the Mérieux Foundation, and Metabiota. The 120 million dollar agency will last only 5 years, being founded in May 2018 and shutting down in May 2023. The initiative operates in 20 countries, mostly African and Southeast Asian countries. The projects goals are to:

1. Improve the detection of diseases of public health importance and identification of antimicrobial resistance (AMR) in priority infectious diseases including Tuberculosis (TB) through an accessible, accurate, adaptable, timely, and integrated diagnostic network system.
2. Improve the quality of real-time surveillance systems for pathogens of greatest public health concern, including AMR and zoonotic diseases.
3. Generate evidence-based guidance and innovative solutions to strengthen in-country diagnostic networks and surveillance systems.

Tuberculosis was the main focus of IDDS, especially in Africa although they had pivoted somewhat to COVID-19 during the pandemic.
