= Cosmic Voyage (1996 film) =

- Directed by: Bayley Silleck
- Written by: Michael Miner; Bayley Silleck
- Produced by: Jeffrey Marvin; Bayley Silleck
- Narrated by: Morgan Freeman
- Music by: David Michael Frank
- Production company: Cosmic Voyage Inc.
- Distributed by: IMAX Corporation; National Air and Space Museum
- Release date: 1996
- Running time: 36 minutes
- Country: United States
- Language: English

Cosmic Voyage is a 1996 short documentary film produced in the IMAX format, directed by Bayley Silleck, produced by Jeffrey Marvin, and narrated by Morgan Freeman. The film was presented by the Smithsonian Institution's National Air and Space Museum, and played in IMAX theaters worldwide. The film is available in the DVD format.

== Synopsis ==
Cosmic Voyage has a format similar to Eva Szasz's Cosmic Zoom, and Charles and Ray Eames's classic Powers of Ten educational video. All were based on the 1957 book Cosmic View by Dutch educator Kees Boeke. Cosmic Voyage takes viewers on a journey through forty-two orders of magnitude, beginning at a celebration in Venice, Italy and slowly zooming out into the edge of the observable universe. Then the view descends back to Earth, into a drop of water on a leaf beside a waterway in Kinderdijk, Netherlands, down to the level of subatomic particles (quarks).

In addition, the film offers some brief insight on the Big Bang theory, black holes, and the development of the Solar System. It also simulates a journey through Fermilab's Tevatron particle accelerator in Chicago, where an atom collision is depicted.

== Production ==
Parts of the film were shot in the Canyonlands in Utah.

== Awards ==
Cosmic Voyage was nominated for a 1997 Academy Award under the category of Best Documentary Short Subject.
