= Biles Creek (Delaware River tributary) =

- Biles Creek

Location
- Country: United States
- State: Pennsylvania
- County: Bucks
- Township: Falls

Physical characteristics
- Source
  - coordinates: 40°11′21″N 74°45′33″W
  - elevation: 7 feet (2.1 m)
- Mouth
  - coordinates: 40°10′22″N 74°44′13″W
  - elevation: 7 feet (2.1 m)
- Length: 2.5 miles (4.0 km)
- Basin size: 0.25 square miles (0.65 km^{2})

Basin features
- Progression: Biles Creek → Delaware River → Delaware Bay
- River system: Delaware River

Biles Creek is a tributary of the Delaware River in Falls Township, Bucks County, Pennsylvania. Named for William Biles, who purchased the island later known as Biles Island, consisting of 309 acres (125 ha). Biles arrived in Bucks County on 12 June 1679, three years before the arrival of William Penn.

== Statistics ==
The Geographic Name Information System I.D. is 1169615, U.S. Department of the Interior Geological Survey I.D. is 02938. Biles Creek drains a watershed of 0.25 square miles (0.65 km^{2}), and meets it confluence at the Delaware's 130.55 river mile.

== Municipalities ==
- Falls Township

== See also ==
- List of rivers of Pennsylvania
- List of rivers of the United States
- List of Delaware River tributaries
