= Fallsington, Pennsylvania =

Unincorporated community in Pennsylvania, US

- Unincorporated community
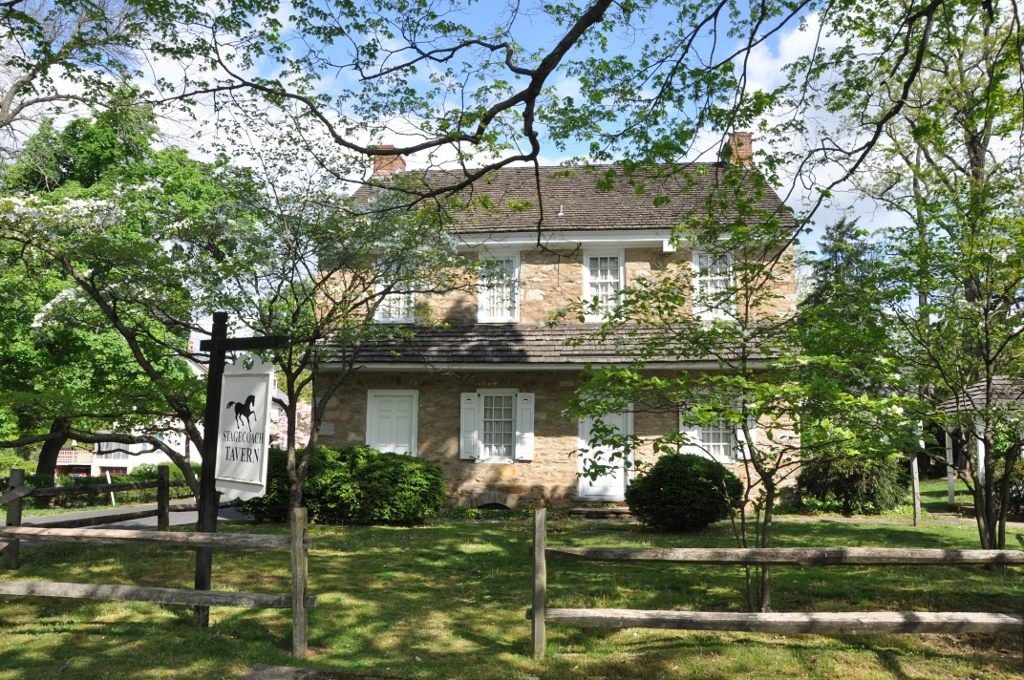
- Stage Coach Tavern

- Location within Pennsylvania Location within the United States
- Coordinates: 40°11′14″N 74°49′08″W
- Country: United States
- State: Pennsylvania
- County: Bucks
- Township: Falls
- Elevation: 92 ft (28 m)
- Time zone: UTC-5 (Eastern (EST))
  - Summer (DST): UTC-4 (EDT)
- ZIP code: 19054
- Area codes: 215, 267 and 445
- GNIS feature ID: 1174608

Fallsington is an unincorporated community in Falls Township, Bucks County, Pennsylvania, United States.

== Geography ==
The latitude of Fallsington is 40.187N. The longitude is -74.819W.

It is in the Eastern Standard time zone. Elevation is 82 feet (25 m).

== History ==
Fallsington is an example of a crossroads community typical of the 18th century, on the Kings Highway (now U.S. Route 13). The Bucks County Courthouse, established in 1683, is said to have been located in Fallsington until it was moved to Bristol in 1705. The first meetings of the Religious Society of Friends were held in the home of William Biles on Biles Island. Falls Monthly Meeting found a site for the first brick meetinghouse built in Fallsington, about 1690, on 6 acres (0.024 km^{2}) of land that had been donated by Samuel Burgess. Also in 1690, Thomas Janney donated 72 acres (0.29 km^{2}) of land to be used as the Quaker burial grounds for Falls Monthly Meeting. William Penn donated a tract of 120 acres (0.49 km^{2}), for a Falls commons.

Fallsington evolved through a succession of periods in American history and architecture. Significant homes in Fallsington range from the late 17th century through the Victorian era of the mid-19th century. Fallsington was a center of commerce. A business directory of the 1860s listed blacksmiths, a butcher, carpenters, a carriage builder, a cooper, farmers, an insurance agent, machinists, physicians, a surveyor, and a wheelwright.

The growth of Fallsington continued, with the construction of homes, an inn, public buildings, stores, and small craftsmen's shops. Until the construction of Fairless Hills and Levittown, it was the largest settlement in the Township, and functioned for many years as a commercial center.

The Fallsington Historic District was listed on the National Register of Historic Places in 1972.

== Trivia ==
- The "falls" of the Delaware River is not a dramatic waterfall but, rather, the rapids that mark the highest navigable point on the river. The names of Fallsington and Falls Township derive from it. While the word "falls" (again, likely a shortened form of "waterfalls") appears in the names of both Fallsington and Falls Township, the original waterfall was never visible from any point within Fallsington or Falls Township. Instead, "falls" refers to a small section of the Delaware River, in Morrisville, Bucks County, Pennsylvania near the Lower Trenton Bridge.
