= Pennsbury School District =

School district in Pennsylvania

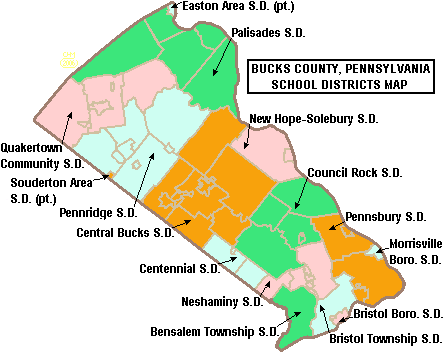

Location
- Bucks County, Pennsylvania, 19058; United States

District information
- Grades: K-12
- Established: 1948
- Superintendent: DR.Thomas A Smith, Ed.D.
- Schools: 1 High, 3 Middle, 11 Elementary

Students and staff
- Students: 10,495
- Student–teacher ratio: 12:1
- Colors: Black & Orange

Other information
- Website: www.pennsburysd.org

Pennsbury School District is located in Bucks County, Pennsylvania, in the United States. The district serves Falls Township, Lower Makefield Township, Yardley Borough, and Tullytown Borough. For the 2019-2020 school year, there were 10,257 students enrolled in the district with a final budget of $216,719,362. There was a total of 1,580 administrative, professional and support staff.

== Schools ==
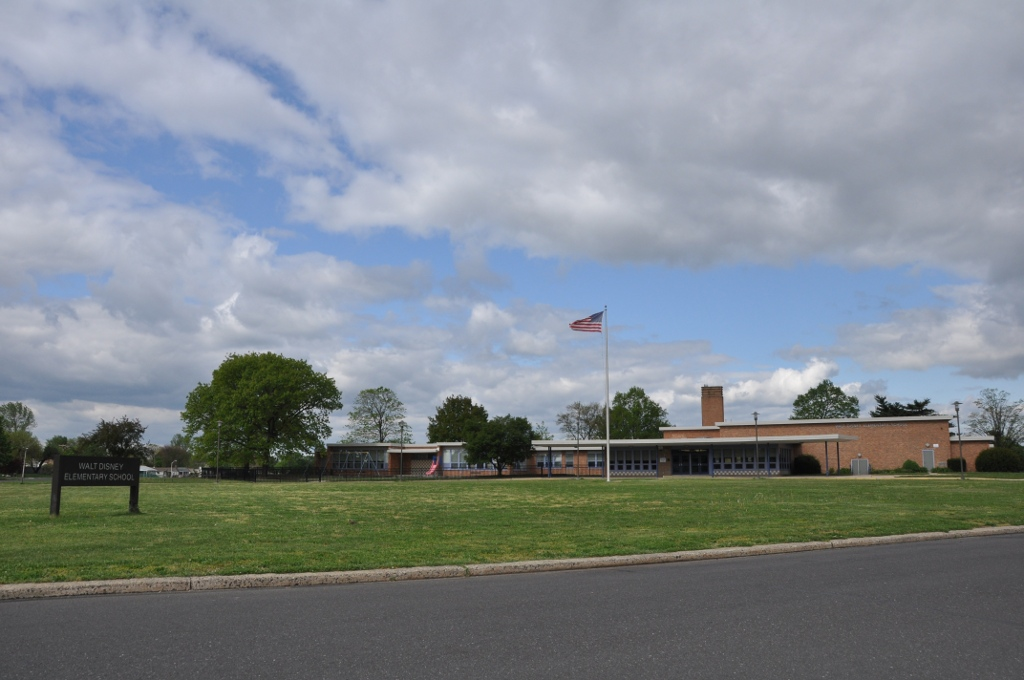
Walt Disney Elementary School

There are 15 public schools in Pennsbury School District:

| Type | Name | Grades | Enrollment |
| High school | Pennsbury High School | 9-12 | 2,891 |
| Middle school | Charles H. Boehm | 6-8 | 713 |
| Middle school | Pennwood | 6-8 | 755 |
| Middle school | William Penn | 6-8 | 961 |
| Elementary school | Walt Disney | KG-5 | 339 |
| Elementary school | Manor | KG-5 | 434 |
| Elementary school | Afton | KG-5 | 499 |
| Elementary school | Edgewood | KG-5 | 501 |
| Elementary school | Eleanor Roosevelt | KG-5 | 566 |
| Elementary school | Fallsington | KG-5 | 267 |
| Elementary school | Makefield | KG-5 | 363 |
| Elementary school | Oxford Valley | KG-5 | 392 |
| Elementary school | Penn Valley | KG-5 | 407 |
| Elementary school | Quarry Hill | KG-5 | 446 |
| Elementary school | Village Park Academy | PRE-K | ??? |

== History ==
=== 2005 teachers' strike ===
In 2005, the Pennsbury School District experienced a teachers' strike that generated significant regional coverage by the media. After voting down a tentative contract agreement, the leadership of the Pennsbury Education Association (PEA), the union to which all of Pennsbury's teachers belong, was authorized by its members to strike on October 24, 2005. The strike lasted a total of 21 days, the maximum allowed by Pennsylvania state law, and students went back to class on November 22, 2005. According to both the PEA and the school board, salary and health benefits were the main issues. Teachers objected to having to pay more for their health insurance, and wanted to see teacher salaries stay competitive with neighboring school districts. Both sides entered non-binding arbitration on November 22, 2005, as mandated by state law, and posted their final offers on December 6, 2005. In January 2006, teachers and the school board reached a resolution and the contract was accepted.

== Demographics ==
The district is about 82% White, 6% Black, 5% Asian and 5% Hispanic. Almost 91% of students speak only English at home. Press reports indicate that 98% of the district's teachers are White.
