= Falls Township Community Park =

- Location within Pennsylvania
- Type: Municipal park
- Location: Falls Township, Pennsylvania
- Coordinates: 40.158057°N 74.807986°W
- Area: 236 acres (96 hectares)
- Open: Daily

Falls Township Community Park is a municipal park located in and operated by Falls Township, Bucks County, Pennsylvania. It is situated in two sections divided by a creek. One side is centered around a man-made lake with a trail around the lake and various amenities including a dog park, basketball courts, roller hockey rinks, a softball field, and a skate park. The lake itself is open to fishing and small-craft recreation boating with a boat ramp located on premises. The other side of the park is mostly composed of picnic pavilions and multipurpose fields. In the winter, the lake side of the park also features a sledding hill

== Ecology ==
A variety of fish can be found in the lake including Black and White crappie, Yellow perch, Bluegill, Brown bullhead, White catfish, Walleye, Tiger muskellunge, and Smallmouth bass.
