= William Yardley (settler) =

American settler and Quaker minister (1632–1693)

- Born: 1632; Rushton Spencer
- Died: May 6, 1693 (aged 61); Yardley, Pennsylvania
- Citizenship: Province of Pennsylvania
- Occupations: Legislator; Quaker minister
- Employer: Province of Pennsylvania
- Known for: Namesake of Yardley, Pennsylvania
- Spouse: Jane
- Children: Enoch, William and Thomas

William Yardley (1632 – 6 May 1693) was an early settler of Bucks County, Pennsylvania, and is the namesake of the borough of Yardley, Pennsylvania. As a persecuted Quaker minister, Yardley and his wife, Jane (nee Heath) moved from Ransclough, England, near Leek, Staffordshire, to Bucks County when Yardley was 50.

The family arrived on September 28, 1682, on the ship Friend's Adventure with their children, Thomas, Enoch, and William, and a servant, Andrew Heath (1667-1720). Yardley subsequently purchased 500 acres (2.0 km^{2}) of land in Lower Makefield Township in Bucks County from William Penn, who had received the land from Charles II of England to settle a debt owed Penn's father. Yardley named his tract "Prospect Farm". He served as a justice of the peace for Bucks County and became a member of the Provincial Council.

Jane died in 1691 and Yardley died in 1693. In his will, Yardley bequeathed half of “Prospect Farm” to his eldest son, Enoch, while the other half was divided between his sons William and Thomas.

Sadly, all of William Yardley's descendants died of smallpox in 1702-03. Due to English laws, Yardley’s estate reverted to his closest male relatives in England—his brother Thomas and nephews, Thomas and Samuel. Yardley's nephew, Thomas Yardley, arrived from England in 1704. This journey altered the course of Thomas’ life. Choosing to remain in America, he thrived in this new environment. In a 1977 article, Yardley historian Catherine Belville described him as “the creative spirit of early Yardley.”

Through marriage, nephew Thomas added land to Yardley's former holdings and had ten children.

== History ==
William Yardley was born in 1632 in Ransclough, England, located in Staffordshire. He was raised as an agriculturist, but associated with the mystic religious community in Renaissance England called the Family of Love.

When Yardley was 15, English Dissenter George Fox began preaching an unusual and uncompromising approach to English Puritanism. This led to the founding of the Religious Society of Friends, also called the Quakers, a year later in 1648. In 1656, at the age of 23, Yardley began preaching on behalf of the Quakers. Two years later, he became a Quaker minister. Over the next twenty-five years, Yardley preached throughout England and was imprisoned several times along with many other Quakers, including William Penn. In one harsh imprisonment, Yardley's only resting place for three months was the bare, unheated floor of his cell.

In March 1681, Penn founded the Province of Pennsylvania as a primary refuge for persecuted English Quakers. Yardley was an uncle of one of Penn's most trusted friends and counselors, Phineas Pemberton. With plans to leave England, Yardley made an agreement with Penn to buy 500 acres (2.0 km^{2}) for ten pounds (about nineteen U.S. dollars). At the age of 50 in 1682, Yardley and wife Jane (nee Heath), sons Enoch, William and Thomas, and servant Andrew Heath sailed to the America on the ship Friend's Adventure. On the ship, Yardley brought with him 2 bundles, 2 tubs, 3 chests, 1 pack, 2 boxes qty. 2 cwt. wrought iron, 1/2 cwt. pewter, 30 lbs, woolen cloth, 100 ells English linen, 40 lbs. new shoes, 2 cwt. nails; 1/2 chest window glass, 1/2 cwt. haberdashery wares.

On arriving in America, Yardley became the first person named "Yardley" to immigrate into America. The family eventually made their way to Falls, Bucks County, Pennsylvania, arriving there on September 28, 1682. Within the next few days, Yardley located 500 acres (2.0 km^{2}) on the west bank of the Delaware River covering what is now Yardley, Pennsylvania. Penn gave Yardley a warranty deed on October 6, 1682, and the land officially became Yardley's about five years later on January 23, 1687, through a land patent.

By the end of 1682, Yardley built his farmhouse on what is now called Yardley Dolington Road, about a mile from Yardley, Pennsylvania. He called his farmhouse and adjoining 500 acres (2.0 km^{2}) of land "Prospect Farm." In 1683, Yardley presided over the marriage of Richard Hough, one of the first marriages among the English settlers. In addition, Yardley almost immediately took a prominent part in the affairs of the Province of Pennsylvania.

Yardley was an influential man. Over the next ten years, Yardley signed one of the frames of Pennsylvania's Great Charter, represented Bucks County in the first Pennsylvania Provincial Assembly, was a member of the Executive Council of the Province of Pennsylvania and helped establish Fallsington Friends Meeting. Thomas Janney (1633–1696), Yardley's brother-in-law, wrote of him, about the time of his death: "He was a man of sound mind and good understanding."

Sadly death came to the Yardley family. Wife Jane died in 1691 and William died in 1693. In his will, William bequeathed half of “Prospect Farm” to his eldest son, Enoch, while the other half was divided between his sons William and Thomas.

The Yardleys faced further devastation during the smallpox epidemic of 1702–03, which spread to Bucks County and claimed the lives of all of William's descendants. Enoch and Thomas both died on November 23, 1702. By January 1703, all five of their children had also perished. Their brother William, who remained unmarried, died in December 1702. Although the wives of Enoch and Thomas survived, they were legally barred from inheriting their husbands' property.

Due to English laws, Yardley’s estate reverted to his closest male relatives in England—his brother Thomas and nephews, Thomas and Samuel.

== After death ==
Thomas Yardley, nephew of William, came to Bucks County in 1704 with power of attorney of his father Thomas and brother Samuel. This journey altered the course of Thomas’ life. Choosing to remain in America, he thrived in this new environment.

The tract of William Yardley covered the site of Yardley, and, after his death, his nephew Thomas established a ferry there, called "Yardley's ferry," which the Pennsylvania Provincial Assembly confirmed to him in 1722. The ferry sometimes was called Howell's ferry since that was the name of the ferry kept on the New Jersey side of the Delaware River. Yardley's ferry soon after became an important point, and, later in the 18th century, when the three great roads leading to Philadelphia, via the Falls, Four Lanes end (now Langhorne), and Newtown terminated there, the ferry became a thoroughfare of travel and traffic for a large section of East Jersey.

Through his marriage to the daughter of William Biles, a prominent Provincial Judge, Assemblyman and Councilman, and the siring of ten children, nephew Thomas combined the properties of his uncle, William Yardley, and father-in-law, William Biles.
