= Suburbicon =

2017 film by George Clooney

- Theatrical release poster
- Directed by: George Clooney
- Written by: Joel Coen Ethan Coen; George Clooney; Grant Heslov
- Produced by: George Clooney; Grant Heslov; Teddy Schwarzman
- Starring: Matt Damon; Julianne Moore; Noah Jupe; Oscar Isaac
- Cinematography: Robert Elswit
- Edited by: Stephen Mirrione
- Music by: Alexandre Desplat
- Production companies: Black Bear Pictures; Dark Castle Entertainment; Smokehouse Pictures; Huahua Media
- Distributed by: Paramount Pictures
- Release dates: September 2, 2017 (Venice); October 27, 2017 (United States)
- Running time: 105 minutes
- Country: United States
- Language: English
- Budget: $25 million
- Box office: $12.8 million

Suburbicon is a 2017 American black comedy crime film directed by George Clooney and co-written by the Coen brothers, Clooney, and Grant Heslov. It stars Matt Damon, Julianne Moore, Noah Jupe, and Oscar Isaac, and follows a mild-mannered father in 1959 who must face his demons after a home invasion, all while a black family moves into the all-white neighborhood. The black family storyline is loosely based on a 1957 incident in Levittown, Pennsylvania, in which a black family moved into the previously all-white neighborhood, leading to racism and violence against the family.

Principal photography for Suburbicon began in October 2016 in Los Angeles. It premiered in the main competition section of the 74th Venice International Film Festival on September 2, 2017, and then was screened at the 2017 Toronto International Film Festival before being theatrically released by Paramount Pictures in the United States on October 27, 2017. The film received mixed reviews from critics and was a box-office bomb, earning $12.8 million against its $25 million budget.

== Plot ==
In the late spring of 1959, the peaceful, all-white neighborhood of Suburbicon is shaken by the arrival of the black Mayers family.

Gardner Lodge, a seemingly mild-mannered family man, lives in Suburbicon with his paraplegic wife, Rose, and their son, Nicky. One night when Rose's identical twin sister, Margaret, is staying over, two robbers, Sloan and Louis, break into his house, tie the whole family up, and knock them out with chloroform. Rose receives an overdose and never regains consciousness. After the funeral, Margaret moves in to help take care of Nicky and soon begins to transform herself into Rose, dyeing her hair blonde and having sex with Gardner.

The Lodges are called to the police station to identify Sloan and Louis, but both Gardner and Margaret say the police have the wrong men, even though Nicky recognizes them as his mother's murderers. Soon after this, Sloan and Louis show up at Gardner's job and demand the money he owes them as payment for killing Rose. When Gardner refuses to pay, they make plans to kill Nicky and Margaret.

With tensions mounting between the residents of Suburbicon and their new black neighbors the Mayers, charismatic insurance agent Bud Cooper arrives on the Lodge's doorstep one day when Gardner is not home and begins to question Margaret. He initially says he is simply looking to clear up red flags in a life insurance claim Gardner made on Rose, but eventually admits to Margaret that he suspects her and Gardner of murdering Rose to collect on the policy, at which point Margaret kicks him out of the house.

That night, as the protracted protest at the Mayers' home turns into a riot, Cooper returns to talk with Gardner. He tells Gardner that he knows the nature of his and Margaret's insurance-fraud plan and attempts to blackmail them into giving him their entire payout in exchange for his silence. Margaret poisons his coffee with lye, and Gardner bashes his head in with a fireplace poker to finish him off. Gardner leaves to hide the body, trailed by Sloan.

Margaret attempts to kill Nicky with a poisoned sandwich and milk after she catches him calling his Uncle Mitch for help, but he refuses to leave his room. Louis enters and strangles Margaret to death. He heads upstairs to murder Nicky, but Mitch arrives just in time and shoots Louis dead. Mitch gives Nicky his gun and hides the boy in a closet before succumbing to a stab wound inflicted by Louis.

On the way home from disposing of Cooper's body, Gardner is taunted by Sloan, who is suddenly hit and killed by a fire truck that was speeding to a fire started by the rioters at the Mayers' home. At his own house, he discovers the bodies of Margaret, Mitch, and Louis, and finds Nicky in the closet. Gardner offers Nicky a choice: to go along with his plan to take the insurance money and run away to Aruba, or die, with Gardner claiming his son was yet another of Louis' victims.

The next morning, Gardner is dead, having consumed the poisoned sandwich and milk during his conversation with Nicky. Nicky calmly goes outside to play ball with Andy, the young son of the Mayer family whom he has befriended, while his parents and a few members of the community clean up the mess left in the wake of the riot.

== Cast ==
- Matt Damon as Gardner Lodge
- Julianne Moore as Rose (Gardner's wife) and Margaret, identical twin sisters
- Noah Jupe as Nicky Lodge, Gardner and Rose's son
- Glenn Fleshler as Ira Sloan, a hitman
- Alex Hassell as Louis, Sloan's partner
- Gary Basaraba as Uncle Mitch, Rose and Margaret's brother
- James Handy as Mayor Billings
- Oscar Isaac as Bud Cooper, an insurance claims investigator
- Jack Conley as Hightower, a police officer investigating Rose's death
- Karimah Westbrook as Mrs. Mayers, wife and mother in the African-American family that moves to Suburbicon
- Tony Espinosa as Andy Mayers, son of the African-American family that moves to Suburbicon
- Leith Burke as Mr. Mayers, husband and father of the African-American family that moves to Suburbicon
- Michael D. Cohen as Stretch, an angry resident of Suburbicon
- Megan Ferguson as June, a resident of Suburbicon
- Richard Kind as John Sears (voice)

== Production ==
According to executive producer Joel Silver, Joel and Ethan Coen originally wrote the script for Suburbicon in 1986, soon after the release of their film Blood Simple. In 2005, it was reported that George Clooney would star in and direct Suburbicon, while the Coen brothers would produce. The film was eventually made ten years later, combining two previously unrelated scripts, one the crime film by the Coens, and the other a historical drama by Clooney and Grant Heslov based on the real-life story of the Myers family, the only black family in all-white Levittown, Pennsylvania, who faced racially-charged harassment and violence from other residents.

On December 8, 2015, Matt Damon, Julianne Moore, and Josh Brolin joined the cast; Oscar Isaac and Woody Harrelson later signed on, as well. On August 31, 2016, Noah Jupe and Glenn Fleshler (replacing Harrelson) joined, to play Damon's character's son and a hitman, respectively.

On September 27, 2016, Harrelson said in an interview that he would not be in the film due to scheduling conflicts. In August 2017, it was reported that Brolin had been cut from the final edit of the film.

Suburbicon began filming in Fullerton, California, 30 miles (48 km) south of Los Angeles, in October 2016. Alexandre Desplat composed the film's score.

== Release ==
Paramount Pictures released the film theatrically in the United States on October 27, 2017. Bloom handled distribution sales in international territories.

=== Home media ===
Suburbicon was released on Digital HD on January 23, 2018, and on Blu-ray and DVD on February 6, by Paramount Home Entertainment in the United States.

== Reception ==
=== Box office ===
Suburbicon grossed $5.8 million in the United States and Canada, and $4.5 million in other territories, for a worldwide total of $10.2 million, against a production budget of $25 million.

In the United States and Canada, Suburbicon was released alongside Thank You for Your Service and Jigsaw, and was projected to gross around $8 million from 2,046 theaters in its opening weekend. However, after making $1.1 million on its first day, weekend estimates were lowered to $3 million. It ended up debuting to $2.8 million, finishing 9th at the box office. The weekend marked the lowest wide opening for any of Clooney's directorial efforts, and of Matt Damon's career, and the 32nd worst-ever opening for a film playing in over 2,000 theaters. Box-office receipts for the film dropped 59% (to $1.2 million) in its second weekend, when it finished 13th at the box office.

=== Critical response ===
On review-aggregator website Rotten Tomatoes, the film has an approval rating of 27% based on 256 reviews, with an average rating of 4.90/10; the site's critical consensus reads: "A disappointing misfire for director George Clooney, Suburbicon attempts to juggle social satire, racial commentary, and murder mystery -- and ends up making a mess of all three." On Metacritic, which assigns a normalized rating to reviews, the film has a weighted average score of 42 out of 100, based on 49 critics, indicating "mixed or average reviews". Audiences polled by CinemaScore gave the film an average grade of "D−" on an A+ to F scale.

David Rooney of The Hollywood Reporter wrote: "Suburbicon is just too obvious in its satirical depiction of the dubious morality and social inequality behind the squeaky-clean façade of postwar American life, though it's watchable enough, and a distinct improvement for Clooney on his last directorial outing." Peter Bradshaw, in a positive review for The Guardian, gave the film 3 out of 5 stars, calling the film "a macabre comedy-noir: watchable, lively, intricately designed, but with exotic plot contrivances and parallel storylines that don't fully gel."

Brian Tallerico, writing for RogerEbert.com, gave the film one and a half stars out of four, writing, "It's tempting to criticize George Clooney's Suburbicon as two films that never quite coalesce into one complete whole, which is partially true. But that might give the impression that either film works on their own, which is false. This startling misfire is a tonal disaster from start to finish, whether residing in the dark comedy that retains echoes of the Coen brother's script or in the more earnestly inspirational true story of a black family that gets run out of white America." Owen Gleiberman of Variety gave it a positive review, calling it "a lightly sneaky and entertaining movie."

=== Accolades ===
Award	Date of ceremony	Category	Recipients	Result	Ref.
London Film Critics Circle	January 28, 2018	Young British/Irish Performer of the Year	Noah Jupe (also for Wonder and The Man with the Iron Heart)	Nominated	
San Diego Film Critics Society	December 11, 2017	Best Supporting Actor	Oscar Isaac	Nominated	
Venice Film Festival	September 9, 2017	Golden Lion	George Clooney	Nominated	
Venice Film Festival	September 9, 2017	Green Drop Award	George Clooney	Nominated	
Venice Film Festival	September 9, 2017	Fondazione Mimmo Rotella Award	George Clooney	Won	
Venice Film Festival	September 9, 2017	Fragiacomo Award	George Clooney	Won	
Venice Film Festival	September 9, 2017	Franca Sozzani Award	Julianne Moore	Won	
Saturn Awards	June 27, 2018	Best Thriller Film	Suburbicon	Nominated	
39th Young Artist Awards	July 14, 2018	Best Performance in a Feature Film – Leading Teen Actor	Noah Jupe	Nominated	

== See also ==
- United States in the 1950s
- Social thriller
