= Jeri Massi =

American technical writer

Jeri M. Massi (born September 4, 1960 in Levittown, Pennsylvania) is a technical writer and an Evangelical Christian author whose novel Valkyries: Some Through the Fire (2003) was nominated for a Christy Award.

Since 2001, Massi has attacked the response of Fundamentalist churches in cases of child molestation committed by members of the clergy in which the leadership (and sometimes the entire congregation) enforced silence on the victims.

In 2005, Massi produced a five-part audio documentary, The Lambs of Culpeper, and released it onto the Internet for free download. The documentary addresses alleged abuses against children at Calvary Baptist Church of Culpeper, Virginia, a church then pastored by Charles Shifflett. In 2007, Massi founded the Conference of the Lambs, a two-day conference designed to assist adults who had been molested as children in Fundamentalist churches. In 2008 Massi self-published Schizophrenic Christianity, which denounced corruption within Protestant Fundamentalism that had resulted in harm, especially to children. In 2009, Massi conducted interviews of former residents of Hephzibah House in Warsaw, Indiana, a Protestant Fundamentalist Children's home for girls. She then produced The Lambs of Hephzibah House, an audio documentary that alleges severe abuse of residents at Hephzibah House. In 2011, Gary Tuchman, a CNN journalist reporting for Anderson Cooper 360, interviewed many of the same former residents and produced an episode about Hephzibah House on CNN's "Ungodly Discipline" series.

== Works ==
- Derwood Inc. (June 1986; Peabody Adventure Series, Book 1)
- A Dangerous Game (June 1986; Peabody Adventure Series, Book 2)
- Treasure in the Yukon (October 1986; Peabody Adventure Series, Book 3)
- The Bridge (1986; Bracken Trilogy, Book 1)
- Courage by Darkness (December 1987; Peabody Adventure Series, Book 4)
- Crown and Jewel (1987; Bracken Trilogy, Book 2)
- The Two Collars (April 1988; Bracken Trilogy, Book 3)
- Llamas on the Loose (June 1988; Peabody Adventure Series, Book 5)
- Abandoned (1 May 1989; Peabody Adventure Series, Book 6)
- Valkyries: Some Through the Fire (2003)
- Valkyries: All Through the Blood (2003)
- Schizophrenic Christianity (2008)
- Hall of Heroes: A Novel Set in Peabody, Wisconsin (14 October 2013)
