= Daisy Myers =

African-American woman (1925–2011)

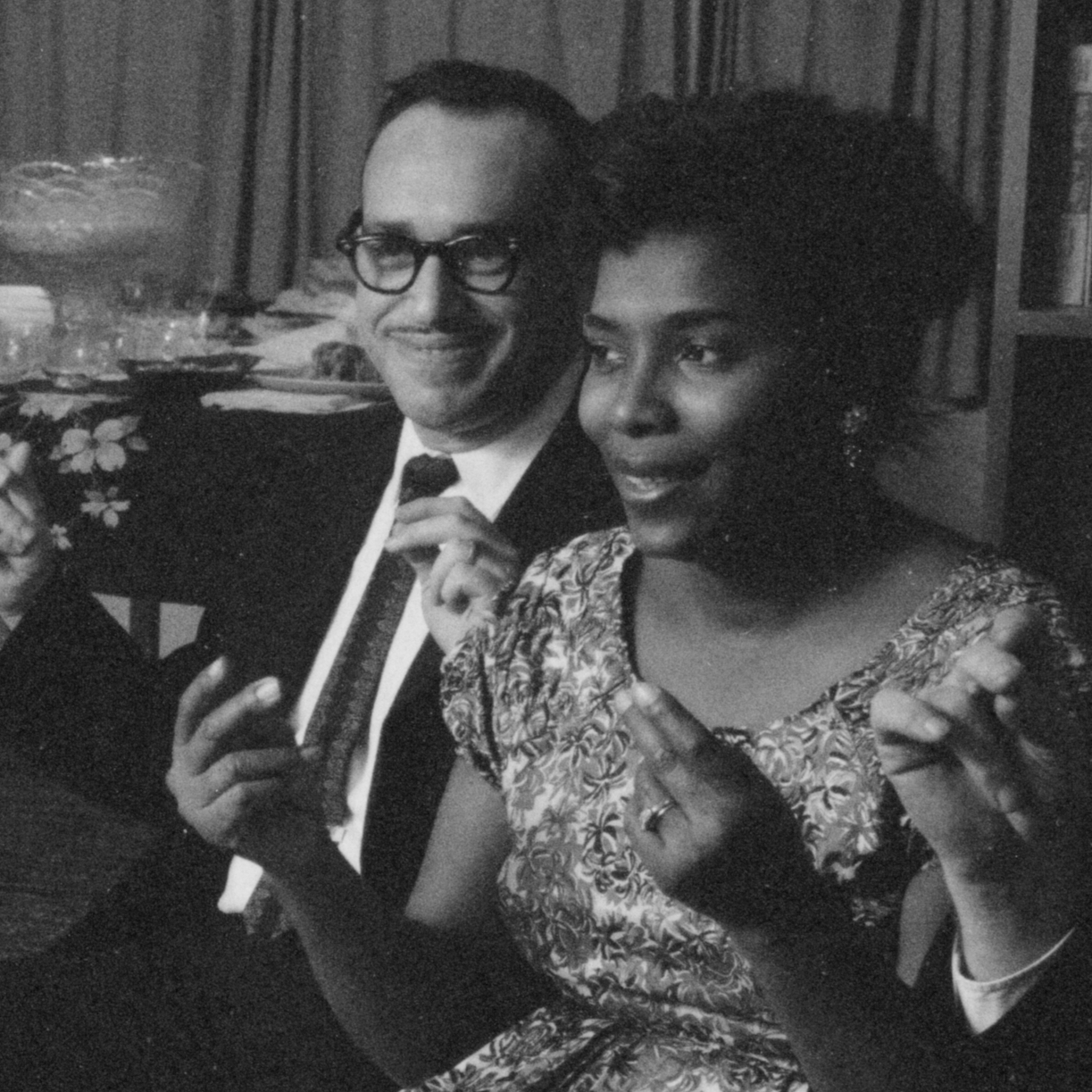
- Daisy Myers in 1957
- Born: Daisy Hockett; February 10, 1925; Richmond, Virginia, U.S.
- Died: December 5, 2011 (aged 86); York, Pennsylvania, U.S.
- Resting place: Susquehanna Memorial Gardens; York, Pennsylvania, U.S.

Daisy D. Myers (February 10, 1925 – December 5, 2011) was an African-American woman who lived with her family in Levittown, Pennsylvania, reportedly designed to be an all-white town, beginning in 1957. She faced months of harassment and violence before security forces (the Pa. state police) intervened to protect the family, leading her to be dubbed the "Rosa Parks of the North".

== Early life and education ==
Daisy Hockett was born in Richmond, Virginia, on February 10, 1925, to Alma and William Lester Hockett, and raised there by the Dailey family. Myers achieved master's degrees in education and guidance counseling, and became a school principal. She met husband William Edward Myers, Jr., an electrical engineer, while they were both students at the Hampton Institute.

== Levittown ==
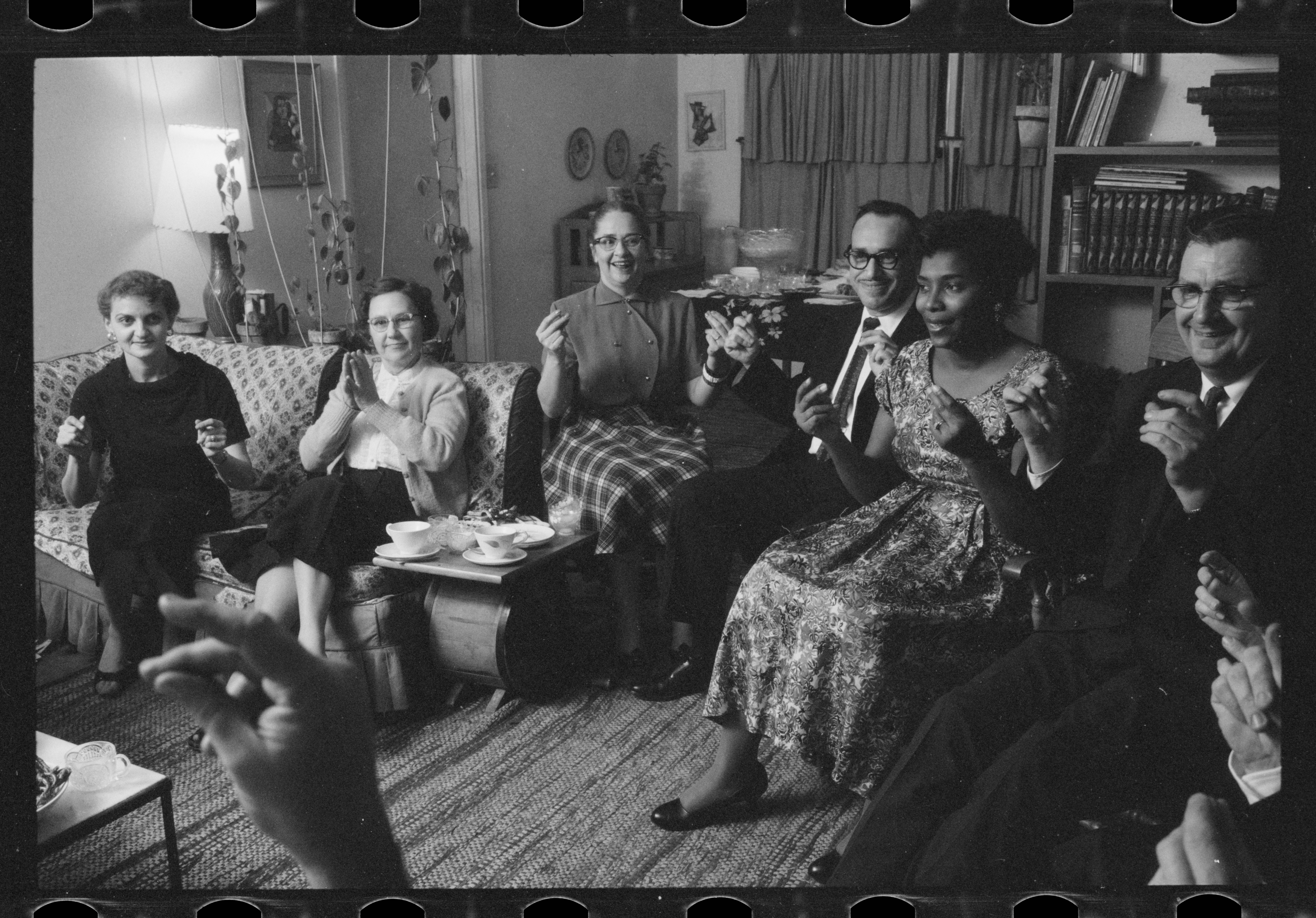
William and Daisy Myers socializing with their neighbors

In mid-1957, the Myerses decided to move with their three children to Levittown, Pennsylvania. In the five years prior to their move, the 15,500 homes in Levittown had been sold only to white people. The Myerses moved to the Dogwood Hollow Section, living at 43 Deepgreen Lane, and were the first African-American family to move to the neighborhood. The Myerses had been systematically turned away by the real-estate development Levitt organization (whose owner, William Levitt, was reportedly a bigot). They instead bought a property in the area being resold by a white-European Jewish couple, rather than from Levitt directly, allowing them to avoid interaction with the developers.

Levittown residents who wanted the family to leave directed increasingly violent attacks towards them over nine days, including threats, harassment, and violence like cross burning and damage to the Myers' property. Some of their white neighbors had to intervene, though neither state nor local authorities managed to stop the harassment. Shortly after their arrival, a court prohibited the assembly of more than three people together in the proximity of the Myers' family home to protect them, but the Bristol Township Police failed to enforce this. Crowds continued to meet, with riots continuing for two weeks after the order until Pennsylvania State Police intervened. Despite this, the Myerses continued to face harassment for nearly three months. This led to the residents being charged and served an injunction. The Myerses and their friendly neighbors would not back down. The family received national attention and support.

After residents realized that the Myerses were going to stay, the harassment gradually stopped and the Myers family was able to more peacefully live there for four more years.

== Later life ==
William Myers accepted a job in Harrisburg, and the family later moved to York, Pennsylvania. According to Lynda Myers, Daisy and William's daughter, her parents did not dwell on the hardships faced in Levittown, and would instead praise the neighbors that helped them. William died at his home in York in 1987, at age 65.

In 2005, Myers published the autobiography Sticks'N Stones: The Myers Family in Levittown. She was invited to the town for a public apology, where she planted a tree in front of the Bristol Township Municipal Building, which was affectionately called "Miss Daisy" (the tree was later toppled by high winds in January 2017, with the township planting a replacement in the same place). She retired from the York City School District after thirty years of employment and was a district assistant for Congressman William F. Goodling. Among the organizations that Myers was involved with were Alpha Kappa Alpha sorority, the Crispus Attucks AARP Group, and Golden UU's; she was also once part of the local YWCA board.

Daisy Myers died on December 5, 2011, in York. She was buried in Susquehanna Memorial Gardens in York. The 2017 film Suburbicon, starring Matt Damon and directed by George Clooney, was inspired by the couple.

== See also ==
- Redlining
