= Walt Disney Elementary School =

- U.S. National Register of Historic Places
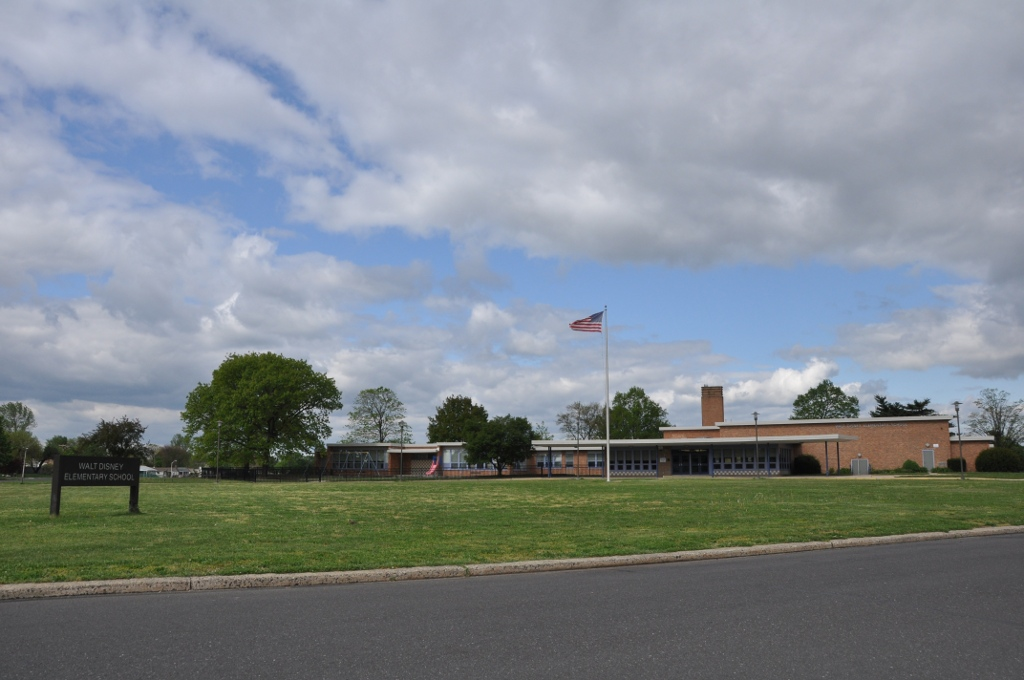
- Walt Disney Elementary School in April 2012

- Location within Pennsylvania Location within the United States
- Location: 200 Lakeside Dr. N, Tullytown, Pennsylvania, U.S.
- Coordinates: 40°9′13″N 74°49′08″W
- Area: 20 acres (8.1 ha)
- Built: 1953-1955, 1964, 1967-1969
- Architectural style: Modern Movement
- NRHP reference No.: 07000889
- Added to NRHP: August 30, 2007

The Walt Disney Elementary School is an historic elementary school building in Tullytown in Bucks County, Pennsylvania, United States. It is part of the Pennsbury School District.

It was added to the National Register of Historic Places in 2007.

== History and architectural features ==
Erected between 1953 and 1955, with expansions made in 1964 and, again, between 1967 and 1969, this historic structure was originally built to accommodate the growing population with the development of Levittown. Dedicated on September 24, 1955, the ceremony was attended by the school's namesake Walt Disney (1901-1966).

This historic structure features a one-story, original section that was erected as a steel frame building that was faced in orange brick and had a flat roof. Reflective of the Modern Movement, it also features large, multi-framed rectangular windows with aluminum sashes. The first expansion was undertaken to create space for a library and the second to provide a two-story classroom and larger library. The building was subsequently renovated between 2005 and 2006.
