= William Biles =

American judge, attorney, land speculator and merchant

- Born: 1644; Dorchester, England
- Died: 19 May 1710 (aged 65–66); Falls Township, Pennsylvania, U.S.
- Education: Exeter College, Oxford
- Spouse(s): Joanna Hellard (1669-1687); Jane Boyd Atkinson (1688-1709)
- Children: William, George, John, Elizabeth, Johanah, Rebeckah & Mary
- Parent(s): Alexander Biles; Dorothy Strong
- Relatives: Rev. William Strong (grandfather)

William Biles (1644 – 19 May 1710) was an American judge, attorney, legislator, sheriff, land speculator and merchant. Born in England and educated in law, Biles brought his family to America in 1679 and settled in what would become Falls Township, Bucks County, Pennsylvania, before the charter of William Penn. The Biles family had been persecuted for their religious dissension in England, and William became a prominent Quaker minister. "After the withdrawal of the Declaration of Indulgence dissenters were more often punished for being absent from their parish churches... Quakers were always fair game and in the following spring (1674) two of them, William Biles and Thomas Strong, were presented at the Assizes." Presumably punishment for being absent from their parish church and attending Quaker ceremonies.

Biles was a Justice of the first Provincial (Supreme) Court which was convened as early as 1681, a member of the Pennsylvania Provincial Council from 1683 to 1700 and of the Legislature from 1686 to 1708. He owned large tracts of land in Pennsylvania and New Jersey (including more than 50,000 acres in what is now Salem County, New Jersey) and was qualified as a proprietor of West New Jersey. He traveled back to England for Quaker interests in 1701 and 1702, and returned to Pennsylvania where he died in 1710.

== Early life and education ==
William Biles was born in 1644 at Dorchester, Dorsetshire, England, the son of Alexander and Dorothy (Strong) Biles. His maternal grandfather, the Rev. William Strong, was a respected preacher at Westminster Abbey who wrote a number of religious tracts and was a supporter of the Parliamentarians during the English Civil War. The Biles (Byles) family had lived at All Saints Parish, Dorchester, for generations. When Biles was seven, in 1651, his paternal grandfather, Alexander Biles, was summoned for criticizing Parson Benn and subsequently stripped of property and title and imprisoned; this undoubtedly influenced William's religious conviction and political attitude. Biles was educated in law: he entered Exeter College, Oxford on 26 October 1660 when he was 16, received his B.A. in 1664, and his M.A. in 1669.

== First marriage ==
Biles married Joanna Hellard on 6 May 1669. They were Anglican until about 1672, after which time they joined the Society of Friends. They are not found in the minutes of Dorchester monthly meeting (MM) prior to that, but their first five children, three sons and two daughters, were recorded there.

== Emigration to and settlement in America ==
An old history book of Burlington, New Jersey (located at the Burlington Township Public Library) claimed that William Biles arrived there in 1677, inferring that he arrived on the ship Kent. However, no ship list for the Kent is known. While it is possible that Biles made an initial trip to America, he would have had to travel back to England, as he is known to have arrived with his family in 1679. It seems likely that their ship, the Elizabeth and Sarah, weighed anchor at New Castle, Delaware, and from there the Biles family made their way to Burlington.

From Phineas Pemberton's List of Arrivals: "William Biles, vile monger, and Johannah, his wife, arrived in Delaware River in the Elizabeth and Sarah of Weymouth, the 4th month [June], 4th day, 1679. Besides his wife and five children, he brought with him two young servants: Edward Hancock to serve eight years and Elizabeth Petty to serve seven years, afterward each to receive 40 acres. They came to America from All Saints Parish, Dorchester, Dorset Co., England." Charles Biles, brother of William, also accompanied the family. Charles was a partner in some real estate purchased in Pennsylvania.

A 'vile monger' was a seller of glass products. Small glass containers or viles were used as containers and drinking vessels, to hold and preserve perfumes, oils, medicines and a myriad of other products. Glassmaking became important in England during the 1500s. By 1575, English glassmakers were producing Venetian-style glass. In 1674, an English glassmaker named George Ravenscroft patented a new type of glass in which he had changed the usual ingredients. This glass, called lead glass, contains a large amount of lead oxide. Lead glass, which is especially suitable for optical instruments, caused English glassmaking to prosper.

Biles and his family perhaps resided at Burlington for a few months before they removed to what would become Bucks County and the colony of Pennsylvania. As the west bank of the Delaware grew more and more into favor and notice, and immigrants came to it, there were several grants of land by Sir Edmund Andros in 1679, among which were two hundred acres to Thomas Fairman in Bensalem, below Neshaminy, and three hundred and nine to William Clark on the same stream. Several English settlers took up land on the west river bank just below the falls by 1679, including Biles.

Two years before William Penn was granted a charter for his colony, Biles purchased land in present-day Falls Township (at that time called "Crewcorne", "Crookhorn", or "Creekhorne") from Sir Edmund Andros, representing the Duke of York. This land consisted of a 300-acre island in the Delaware River (thereafter known as "Biles Island") from Indians named Orecton, Mannacus, Menemblahoking and Patelana. The island appears early on the 1652 Lindstrom map (charted for the King of Sweden) as "Menahanonck", a Lenape Indian name meaning "the island formed by a creek" —now known as "Biles Creek". The island was named "Orecton" on the William Penn Deed a couple years after Biles took possession. Chief Orecton, Chief Lapowinso and other Indian chiefs confirmed the early purchase of Biles Island in a 1727 deed to William Biles, Jr. A 1690 map by Thomas Holme (depicting land owners on the Delaware prior to Penn's Charter of 1681) shows William Biles with two tracts of land that fronted the river and another that he and his brother, Charles, owned jointly.

That same year (1679), Jasper Danckaerts (who met Biles at that time) charted a map of the Delaware River Valley from Burlington Township to Trenton, New Jersey; the map shows William Biles with 309 acres on the west side of the river. The fact that Biles had established his plantation and built a house on the west side of the Delaware River by late 1679 is corroborated by Dankaerts' journal, extracted and transcribed as follows:

Danckaerts and Peter Sluyter, leading members of the Labadist sect of the Netherlands, visited the Delaware in late 1679, going down the river in a boat to New Castle, Delaware. At the falls they stayed overnight with Mahlon Stacy who had erected a mill there. They described the houses of the English along the river as being built mainly of clapboards nailed on the outside of a frame, but "not usually laid so close together as to prevent you from sticking a finger between then." The best people, Danckaerts wrote, plastered them with clay. He called the houses built by the Swedes "block houses," but from the way they were constructed, actually closely resembled the log cabin found on the western frontier at a later date. Some of the more careful people planked the ceilings, and even had glass windows. The chimney was typically in the corner, and the doors were low and wide. Our travelers breakfasted with the Friends at Burlington, whom they denominated as being "the most worldly of men in all their deportment and conversation." Although, elsewhere his descriptions and the relations of the Indians' impressions of the Quakers are not so flattering. They went hence in a shallop to Upland, stopping at Takany (Tacony), a village of Swedes and Finns, where they drank good beer. On Tinicum island they saw a "Quaker prophetess who traveled the country over in order to quake." On their return up the river they stopped overnight on "Alricks' Island" (where the plantation of Peter Aldrichs was situated, on the west side of the river, opposite Matinnaconk Island and Burlington), then in charge of Barent, a Dutchman, who had for housekeeper the Indian wife of an Englishman of Virginia. One of her children was sick with the smallpox, prevalent on the river this year, and mentioned for the first time. Barent consented to pilot them up the river as far as the falls the next day for thirty guilders in zeewant. This was on Friday, 29 December 1679. Landing the canoe on the west side of the Delaware (at or near where Bristol, Pennsylvania, stands), he conducted them by a footpath through the woods in a north-northeast direction until they "came to a plantation, newly begun by a Quaker, where we rested and refreshed ourselves. We agreed with this man, who came into the house while we were there, that he should put us over the river for three guilders in zeewant." They crossed the river about 1 o'clock in the afternoon, and commenced north on a footpath which led to a cart road and took them to the falls where Mahlon Stacy's mill stood. From there they crossed eastward to the Hudson and on to Manhattan.

Although not named by Danckaerts, knowing the few settlers in the area, and from the course they took and the map Danckaerts drew, the Quaker that they met on December 29 at the "plantation just begun" would have been William Biles, and he was the same who ferried Danckaerts and Sluyter across the river for three guilders.

William and Joanna's daughter, Rebeckah, was born on 29 December 1680 in present-day Falls Township, Bucks County, Pennsylvania, the first of the Biles family born in America. Biles began his correspondence with the Society of Friends in England in 1680. Shortly after William Penn opened his grant for settlement in 1681, other Friends began joined the Biles family, settling west of the Delaware River. His house stood for more than two centuries. On Biles' plantation, near Penn's Manor, a large brick dwelling had been represented by tradition and from the initials inscribed upon it as the homestead of William Biles, who is said to have built it of bricks he brought from England.

== Public life ==
William Biles would play a large part in the political, legal, and religious affairs of early Pennsylvania. He held office before Penn's arrival as a member of the "Creekhorne Court" by 1680. The first session of the Pennsylvania Provincial Court (essentially the Supreme Court of the Province) was held at "Upland", where, no doubt, Governor Markham had fixed his residence. The record for the Province of Pennsylvania, at the Court at Upland, September 13, 1681, indicates that "Mr. William Byles" was one of the nine Justices, along with William Clayton and seven others. Biles was also noted as one of the Justices of the Provincial (Supreme) Court, along with Edward Shippen and Cornelius Empsom, held at Chester on the 18th day, 2nd month (April), 1699.

The first known meeting of the Religious Society of Friends west of the Delaware River was held at the home of William Biles below the Falls of Neshaminy. The first entry in Falls MM minutes reads: "At a meeting at William Biles's house, the second day of the third month [May], 1683, then held to wait upon the Lord for his wisdom, to hear what should be offered, in order to inspect into the affairs of the Church, helpful in the work of God; and we, whose names are as follows, being then present, thought it fit and necessary that a Monthly Meeting should be set up, both men and women, for that purpose; and that this meeting to be the first of the men's meetings after our arrival into these parts. The Friends present, —William Yardley, James Harrison, Phineas Pemberton, William Biles, William Dark, Lyonell Brittanie, William Beakes." The home of William Biles was the meeting place for Falls MM until 1690 when Falls Meeting House was built at Fallsington.

On 20 February 1682, an election was ordered for members of the Provincial Council and Assembly. William Biles, Christopher Taylor and James Harrison were elected on 10 March 1682 to the council from Bucks Co. Biles was present at the first session of the first Council held in Philadelphia on 10 January 1683 where William Penn presided. Biles took part in the framing of Pennsylvania's initial laws and was present at the initial reading of Penn's Charter of Privileges in the council chambers, on 2 February 1683, and was among those who voted for it in 1693, when it was finally approved.

William Biles, his son William (Jr.), and brother Charles owned cattle in 1684, having recorded earmarks and brands with Bucks County.

Biles was appointed Interior Receiver for Bucks County on 22 May 1684, under the Deputy Treasurer, by the Provincial Council, for which he received £20 annual salary. On 6 February 1685, he and others were commissioned as constables for the county. On 11 February, he and others were appointed to lay out a road for the county. He was appointed on 1 October 1685 as Special Commissioner to determine all heinous and enormous crimes in Bucks County.

He was elected to the Provincial Assembly in 1686 and was fined twelve pence for being absent the first day, 10 March 1686. He was a member of the Assembly and Council for most of his life in Pennsylvania.

In 1687, all taxes levied in Bucks County were collected by William Biles. Also in 1687, he was called to account by the Society of Friends for selling rum to the Indians. -- "Great disorders from the sale of rum to the Indians. Friends to keep clear of selling rum to Indians or to any that are Indian Traders. Wm. Biles to be cautioned thereof." Thomas Janney spoke to Biles regarding the matter. The act was not against any law, but was not favored by his associates and Biles bowed to the wishes of other Quakers.

Joanna (Hellard) Biles died in 1687—possibly as a result of prevalent sickness that spread after severe floods in the Delaware Valley. Joanna was buried on 4 September 1687, according to Falls MM records. William lived as a widower with his children for 15 months. He made his intention to marry Jane Atkinson known to the Men's Meeting of Falls MM on the 3rd day, 8th month, 1688 and he was liberated to marry by Falls MM on the 7th day, 9th month, 1688. Falls MM marriage records read: "William Biles of Bucks Co., merchant, and Jane Atkinson, of same co., (married) 11th of 10th month 1688." And Middletown MM marriage records read: "William Biles, of Bucks Co., married 11th day of 10th month, 1688, Jane Atkinson, of said co., at the house of William Biles."

Jane (Boyd) Atkinson was the widow of Thomas Atkinson. Thomas Atkinson had been a Quaker minister and farmer whom Biles had aided some years earlier. Jane and Thomas had little material means, and it has been written that the marriage between William and Jane was unusual for the fact that William was a wealthy man and Jane had no dowry to offer; even so, William's land holdings were increased by his second marriage. Jane was a noble woman and a very active Quaker minister; she often traveled in Gospel work. She moved with her children to the Biles plantation within the compass of Falls MM where she continued her ministry. — "Jane, wife of Willm. Biles, proposes the sale of the plantation she formerly lived upon and her said husband also declared his willingness, and desire the advice of this meeting. It was thought by this meeting most profitable for the children of Thomas Atkinson if it be sold and the money and interest on it be paid to the children of Thomas Atkinson when they came of age." William and Jane made many trips to New England colonies in the interest of Friends.

Biles served his second term in the Assembly in 1689 and was appointed to the Commission of Peace in Bucks County. Biles and twelve others met in 1692 at the Friends meeting house at Neshaminy and divided the county into Townships. Biles continued to purchase real estate in the area. He bought 300 acres in Burlington County, West New Jersey for £55 on 10 April 1696 from Thomas Green, Yeoman of Maidenhead, Burlington Co. Between 1699 and 1701, Biles was a Puisne judge and a Justice of the Supreme Court of the Province of Pennsylvania. He sat on the Supreme Court held on 18 April 1699 at Chester and was appointed to the Court of Inquiry for Bucks County in 1700.

He and his wife traveled to England and Ireland in 1701 in the interest of the Society of Friends. — "Jane Biles gives her intentions of visiting Friends in Europe. Wm Biles, her husband, proposes to go with her." A record of their certificate has not been located, but it is believed they were gone for perhaps as long as two years. Upon their return (if the trip was indeed made), they supposedly reported to the Meeting of the trip, although a record of that is not known. They returned to Pennsylvania sometime before December 1702 when the Court of Inquiry was adjourned to Biles' house.

== Controversy with William Penn and Governor Evans ==
William Biles was an influential man in early America and had many political allies and powerful enemies. He apparently was a supporter of the popular party led by David Lloyd (a fellow attorney, judge and Assemblyman) who was an outspoken opponent of a number of schemes proposed by Penn and his colonial officers, as undermining the liberties of the residents of Pennsylvania. As a member of the Assembly of Pennsylvania, on an occasion in 1705, Biles was recognized to address the body and spoke out against then Lieutenant Governor John Evans, saying: "He is not a man. He is but a boy! He is not fit to be our Governor! We'll kick him out! We'll kick him out!"

Needless to say, Evans was greatly offended by the speech; he asked the Assembly to purge itself of "the contagion of the said pernicious member by expelling him [William Biles]." But, after receiving the request, the Assembly rose up and supported Biles with great vigor. Evans was outraged and wrote to William Penn on 5 July 1705 regarding the matter. The following reply by Penn, dated "7th mo. 30th -1705", was sent to Evans:

"Much is said of the lewdness of Pennsylvania. I beg of thee to have regard to my character and give not that advantage against me, either with God or good or bad men, whose ill use of it I most fear on a public account. I have just now received thine of 5th, 5th month and am very sorry that wicked man, D. L. could blow up any of his mermidons to such a pitch as thy account of William Biles relates that is a meer vox et praetara nihil, a cox comb and a pragmatic ingraine. That fellow's plantation is a robbery on Pennsbury and if there be a grant, was not a purchase from me nor toward land write for me was surveyed long before and done in my absence, formerly and Judge Monpresson can tell if I may not be deceived in my grant as well as the Crown, be it King or Queen Since if confirmed it was on. Surprize and rattle an Inquisition about his [William Biles'] ears if not a prosecution. And know when the time is expired of session, as he may be taken to task. Since the service he may pretend he was to attend is over. And do first complain to the Friends and if they won't or can't bow him to make satisfaction, take it by law, thyself. Pray mind what I say be secret, which is discreet and fall on him or any other such unruly people at once and make someone such an example to terrify the rest. Thou hast not only my leave but my liking and encouragement whether called Quakers or not. — [signed] William Penn."

This unflattering description of William Biles and relatively malicious instruction demonstrates the political schemes of the colonial authority to control citizens and squelch the influence of independent men, even by that noble Friend, William Penn. Acting on Penn's directives, Governor Evans sued Biles for £2000 on 23 March 1706 for "defamy". In a shrewd but very bold move, Biles—an attorney and Supreme Court judge—refused to acknowledge the suit and did not even appear to answer the civil charge. Continuing to act on the advice of William Penn, Evans ordered his officers to detain Biles as he returned home from his duty in the Colonial Assembly. Biles was thrown in jail and imprisoned for four weeks. Feelings in the province ran so high that Biles was released and the suit was dropped. Evans, tainted by numerous instances of poor judgment and bad leadership, fell out of favor with Penn and was removed from office in February 1709. He later said of Biles, "He very much influences that debauched county of Bucks, in which there is now scarce any one man of worth left."

During the course of this controversy, Penn's personal secretary, James Logan, made a public assertion that Biles' "numerous family" had filled Bucks County "with whores and rogues; of his 5 daughters four that are married having acquitted themselves before marriage & the last 'tis expected will not be so unmannerly as deviate from the Example all her elder Sisters have Sett before her." Logan also claimed that the youngest daughter, Ann, had given birth to an illegitimate child, and that William, Jr., had fathered a child whose arrival shortly after his marriage had "aroused suspicions."

While it cannot be determined with any certainty if all these allegations are true of false, some of them likely have some kernel of fact at their core. The context of the accusations is very important, however, because Logan, Evans, and other political adversaries of William Biles spread all manner of slanderous rumors in an attempt to pressure the solemn Quakers to disown Biles and to persuade the Colonial Assembly to expel him from their ranks.

The situation between Penn and Biles also was further agitated due to the fact that William Biles's home plantation was on land adjacent to Pennsbury, the personal estate of William Penn. Biles's land was the same tract purchased several years prior to Penn's Charter, which accounted for Penn's characterization of Biles's plantation as a "robbery upon Pennsbury." There were other problems among these neighbors. Quaker records show, as early as 1686, disagreements arose: "A difference exists between James Harrison and Wm. Biles concerning a letter that was written by Harrison to Biles about a servant of the governour's." Apparently a member of Biles's household and one of Penn's servants were involved in an altercation.

== Later life ==
Biles continued his business ventures and land speculation. On 20 July 1705, William Biles (sometime mistranscribed "Bills" in records) of Bucks County, Pennsylvania, and William Couch of London, England, sold to Jonathan Stout (formerly of Monmouth County, who founded Hopewell, New Jersey) one-sixteenth of one-hundredth part of the Province of West New Jersey (that is, Biles and Couch had owned a 0.0625% interest in the colony of West New Jersey, entitled them both to membership on the Council of Proprietors of West New Jersey).

Biles continued to serve in public office, as a judge, and also maintained a private law practice. He was appointed attorney to Joseph Wass of London in September 1707. Shortly thereafter, Wass sold all of his real estate holdings in America to William Biles, including 45,000 acres in Quohakin County and 10,000 acres in Salem County, West New Jersey, bordering the Morris River and Delaware Bay. By his death in 1710, Biles' estate contained about 20,000 acres in New Jersey, 300 acres in Delaware, and 1,000 acres in Bucks County.

Biles was elected to his final service in the Assembly in 1709. His wife, Jane, died and was buried on the 21st day, 10th month (December), 1709 at Falls Meeting House. On 4 January 1709/10 (O.S.), the Pennsylvania Assembly received word that Biles was unable to care for the meeting's accounts due to illness. From Falls MM, Men's Minutes: 5th day, 11th month (January), 1703 (O.S.) — "Reported that William Biles is in necessity of assistance." 3rd day, 3rd month, 1710 — "William Biles being very weak and not likely to continue long it's agreed that George Clough take care of the meeting's collections in his stead." On 2nd day, 5th month, 1710 the accounts continue: "William Biles being deceased ..." Falls MM Births and Deaths records show: "William Biles died the 19th day of 3rd month (May), 1710." He was aged 66 years.

== Final estate ==
The will of William Biles was signed 5th day, 11th month (January) 1709/10 (O.S.). William Biles, Jr. received the bulk of his father's estate, including the large land tracts in West New Jersey.

Abstract of the Will of William Biles:

To my son John Biles, 300 acres of land. To my daughter Elizabeth Hewes, wife of Matthew Hewes [Hughes], the sum of 20 shillings. To my three grandchildren, John, Mary and Grace Beakes, the sum of 50 pounds, to be equally divided between them. To my daughter Johannah Beakes, the wife of Samuel Beakes, the sum of twenty shillings. To my daughter Rebeckah Janney, the wife of Joseph Janney, the sum of one hundred and forty pounds. To their two daughters, Martha and Ann Janney, the sum of ten pounds, to be equally divided between them. To my daughter, Ann, the wife of Thomas Yardley, the sum of one hundred fifty pounds. To my daughter-in-law, Martha Biles, the sum of five pounds. To my three grandchildren, Johannah, Phebe, and Sarah Biles, the daughters of my children George and Martha Biles, the sum of fifteen pounds, to be divided between them. To my three grand-daughters, Ann, Grace, and Sarah, the daughters of my son and daughter William and Sarah Biles, the sum of fifteen pounds, to be divided equally between them. To my sister-in-law, Mary Biles, widow of my brother Thomas Biles, of Dorchester, in the county of Dorset, in old England, eight pounds. To my grandson, William Robbings, the son of my daughter Mary Robbins, the plantation where I last lived, lying betwixt the land of Anthony Burton, and the land of my son, John Biles. It being part of the same land I purchased of Henry Barker, by estimation 200 acres. To my grandchildren, Johannah and Rebeckah Beakes, the daughters of my son and daughter, Samuel and Johannah Beakes, the sum of twenty four pounds. To my son William Biles, all the rest, residue of my lands in West Jersey, etc. Signed, published, declared this fifth day of the Eleventh month called January, 1709, in the presence of us, Jer. Langhorn, Jas. Kirkbride, Robert Scotcher.

== Legacy ==
His son, William Biles, Jr., was also active in Pennsylvania politics, and served as Speaker of the Pennsylvania Provincial Assembly in 1724.
