= Levittown, Pennsylvania =

Unincorporated community in Pennsylvania, US

Levittown
- Census-designated place
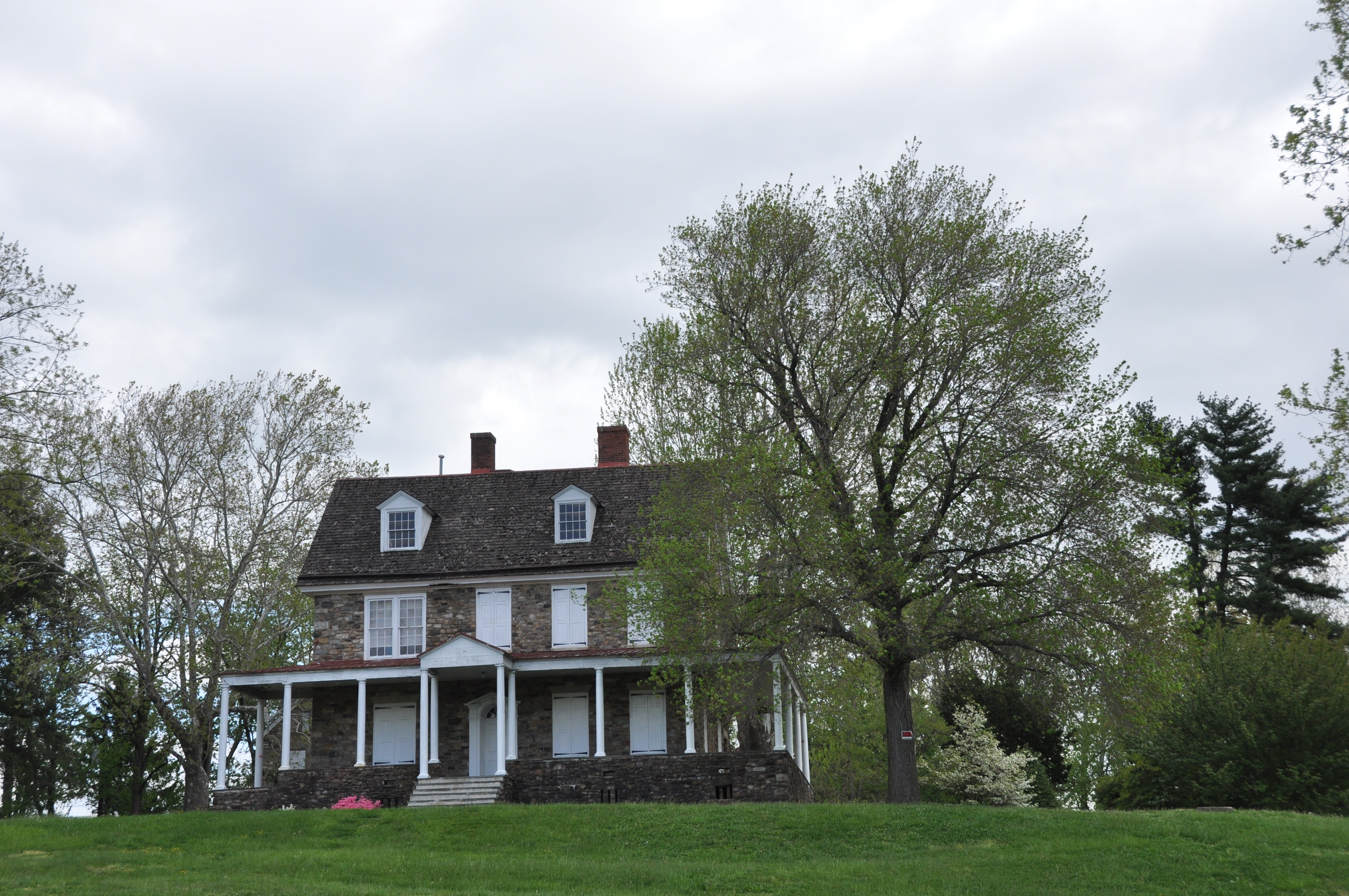
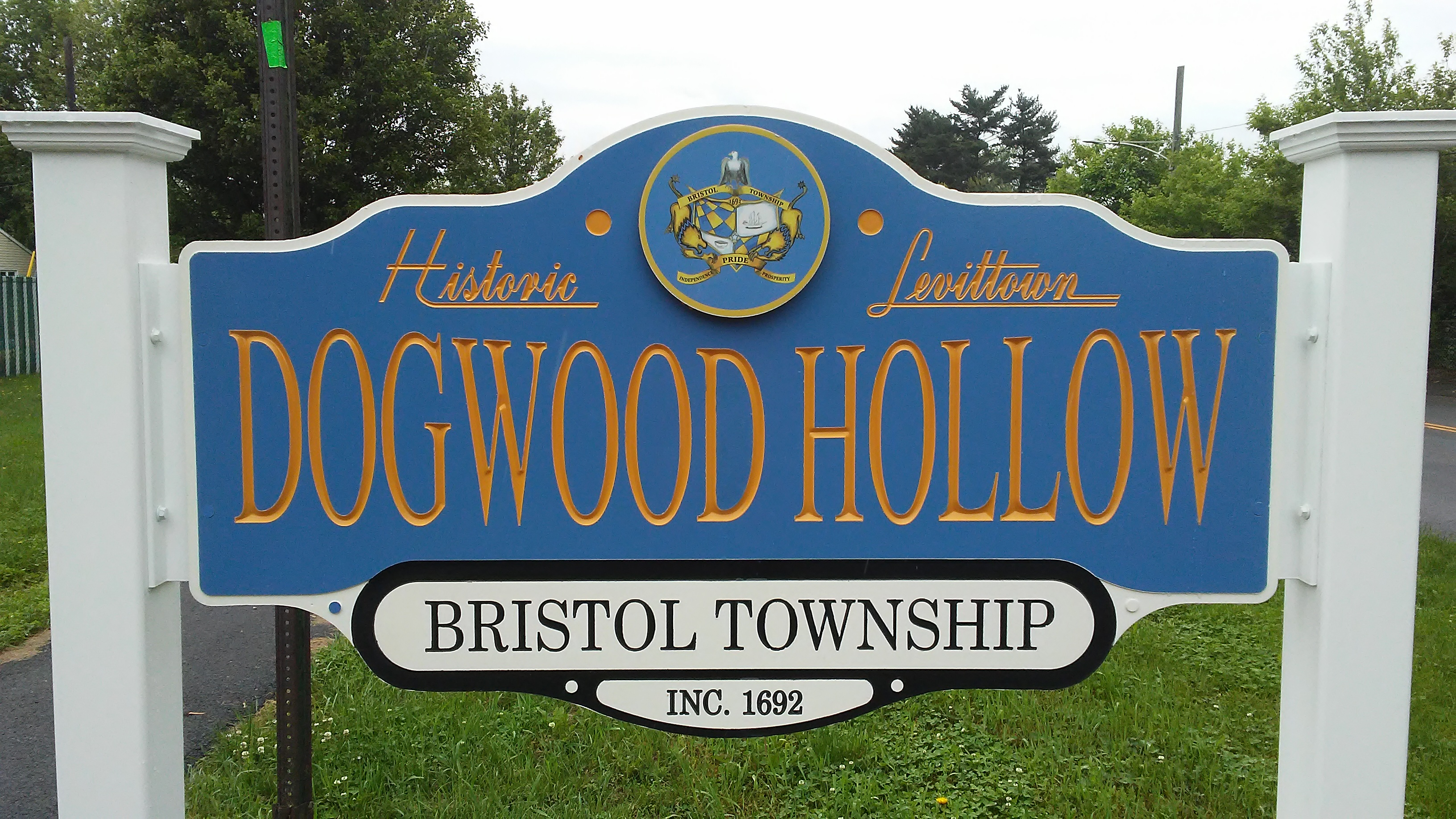
- Phineas Pemberton House Entrance sign to Dogwood Hollow development, erected May 2018.

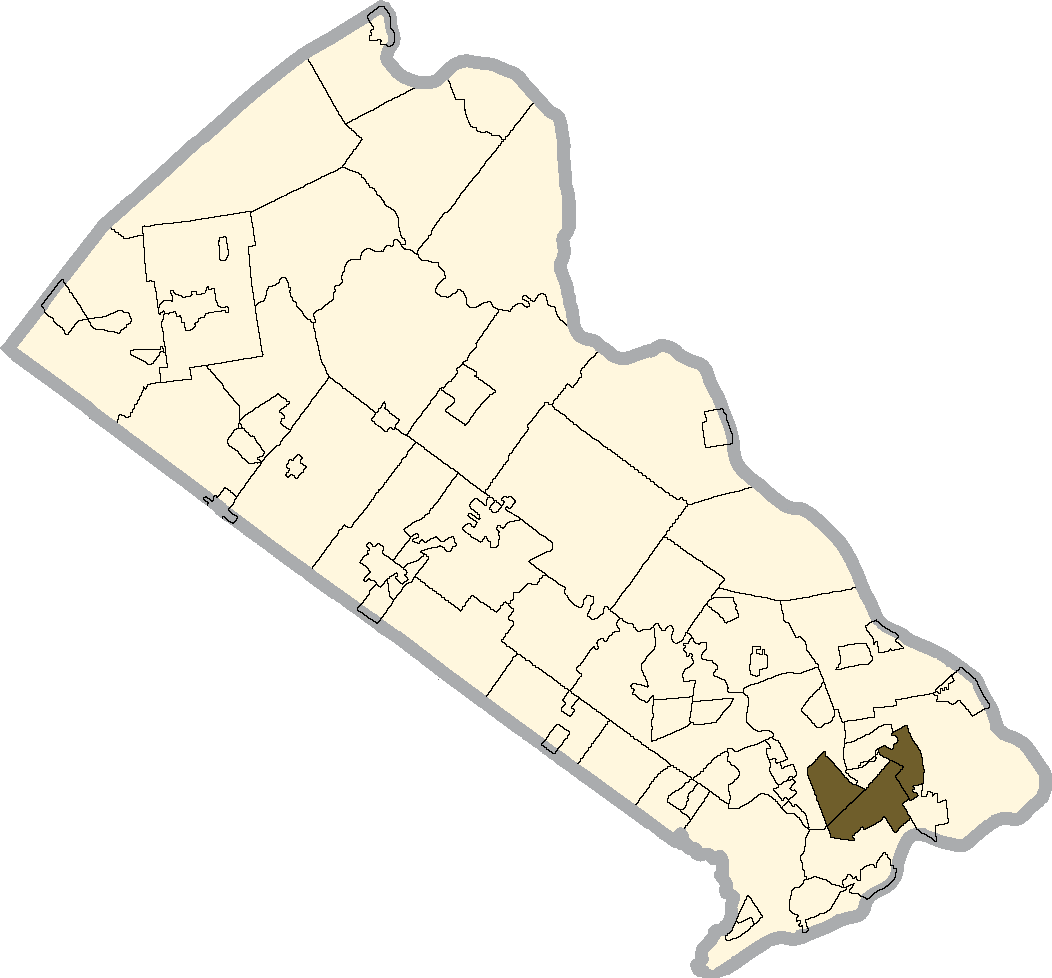
- Location of Levittown in Bucks County
- Interactive map of Levittown
- Location of Levittown in Pennsylvania Levittown (the United States)
- Coordinates: 40°09′15″N 74°50′59″W
- Country: United States
- State: Pennsylvania
- County: Bucks
- Municipalities: Bristol Township, Falls Township, Middletown Township and Tullytown Borough

Area
  - Total: 10.40 sq mi (26.94 km^{2})
  - Land: 10.30 sq mi (26.68 km^{2})
  - Water: 0.10 sq mi (0.26 km^{2})
- Elevation: 30 ft (9.1 m)

Population (2020)
  - Total: 52,699
  - Density: 5,116.2/sq mi (1,975.38/km^{2})
- Time zone: UTC−5 (EST)
  - Summer (DST): UTC−4 (EDT)
- ZIP Codes: 19054–19055 and 19057–19058
- Area codes: 215, 267, and 445
- FIPS code: 42-42928

Pennsylvania Historical Marker
- Designated: August 8, 2017

Levittown is a census-designated place (CDP) and planned community in Bucks County, Pennsylvania, United States. The community includes portions of the municipalities of Bristol Township, Falls Township, Middletown Township and Tullytown Borough, but is not itself an independent municipality. Levittown is part of the Philadelphia metropolitan area with a population was 52,699 at the 2020 census, which is down from 52,983 at the 2010 census.

Levittown is 40 feet (12 m) above sea level. While not an independent municipality, it is sometimes recognized as the largest suburb of Philadelphia while Upper Darby, Lower Merion, Bensalem, Abington, and Bristol townships are municipalities larger in size within the three surrounding Pennsylvania counties. Starting with land purchased in 1951, it was planned and built by Levitt & Sons. The brothers William Levitt and architect Alfred Levitt designed its six typical houses.

== History ==
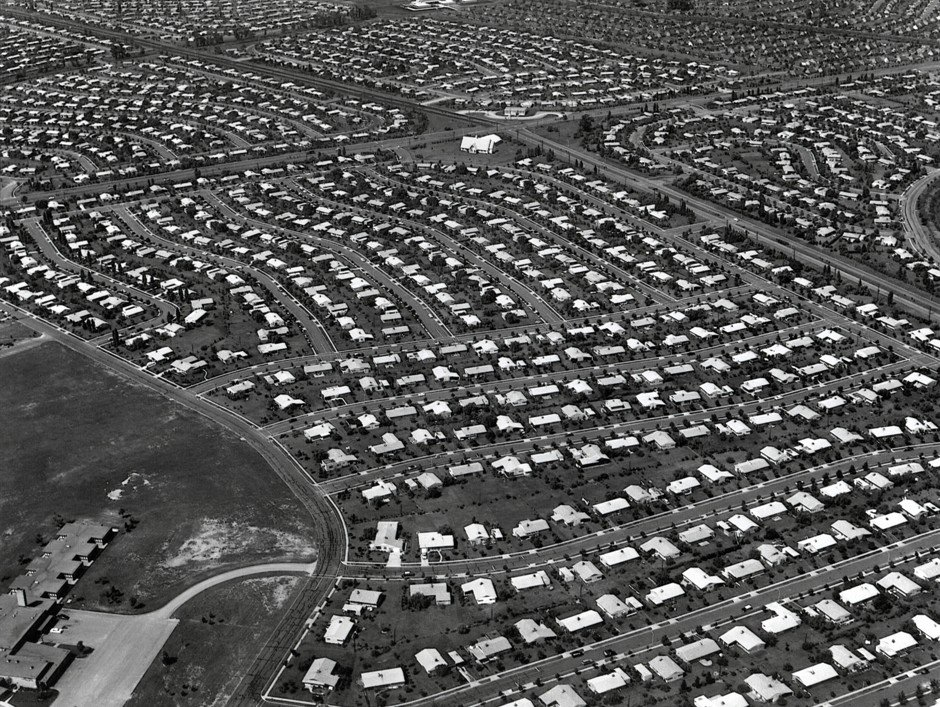
Aerial view of Levittown c. 1959

Most of the land on which Levittown is built was purchased in 1951. Levitt and Sons only built six models of houses in Levittown, all single-family dwellings with lawns: the Levittowner, the Rancher, the Jubilee, the Pennsylvanian, the Colonial and the Country Clubber, with only modest exterior variations within each model. The homes were moderately priced and required only a low down payment.

Construction of Levittown began in February 1952, soon after completion of Levittown, New York, located on Long Island. Levittown, Pennsylvania, was the second "Levittown" built by William J. Levitt, who is often credited as the creator of the modern American suburb.

To speed up construction, Levitt & Sons perfected a 26-step rationalized building method that was essentially an assembly line type of home building. The house remained stationary while construction workers moved from site to site, each repeatedly performing a task such as pouring foundations, putting up pre-fabricated walls, installing plumbing, or doing electrical work. At peak production, this highly regimented process enabled Levitt's workers to produce a finished house every sixteen minutes. Construction of the homes commenced in 1952 and when completed in 1958, 17,311 homes had been built.

What set Levittown apart from other developments at the time was that it was built as a complete community. Levitt & Sons designed neighborhoods with traffic-calming curvilinear roads, in which there were no four-way intersections. Each neighborhood had within its boundaries a site donated by Levitt & Sons for a public elementary school. Locations for churches and other public facilities were set aside on main thoroughfares such as the Levittown Parkway, likewise donated by the builder to religious groups and other organizations.

Other amenities included Olympic-sized public pools, parks, greenbelts, baseball fields and playgrounds, and a shopping center located in neighboring Tullytown borough that was considered large and modern at the time of its construction (and in fact was the largest east of the Mississippi). The first set of four sample homes were put on display in a swatch of land near the future Levittown Shop-a-Rama, and an estimated 30,000 people viewed them in that first weekend.

Residents, who are sometimes called Levittowners, were first expected to comply with a lengthy list of rules and regulations regarding the upkeep of their homes and use of their property. Two of these "rules" included a prohibition on hanging laundry out to dry on Sunday and not allowing homeowners to fence off their yards. These proved unenforceable over time, particularly when backyard pools became financially accessible to the working class and privacy concerns drove many to fence off their yards. In the years since Levitt & Sons ended construction, three- and four-story "garden apartments" and a number of non-Levitt owner-occupied houses have been built in Levittown.

William Levitt had a career-long commitment to a whites-only policy in their developments. Levitt & Sons would not sell homes to African Americans. Levitt did not consider himself to be a racist, considering housing and racial relations entirely separate matters. Initially, the Federal Housing Administration (FHA) conditioned essential financing for this and similar projects on the restriction of home sales to those of "the Caucasian race", as stipulated in housing rent and sales agreements and deed covenants. This did not prevent Bea and Lew Wechsler, a Jewish couple from the Bronx, from connecting an African-American family to a neighbor who desired to sell his home. Levittown's first Black couple, William and Daisy Myers, bought a home in the Dogwood Hollow section in 1957. Their move to Levittown was marked with racist harassment and mob violence, which required intervention by state authorities. This led to an injunction and criminal charges against the harassers while the Myerses and their supporters refused to surrender and received national acclaim for their efforts. For instance, Daisy Myers has been hailed as "The Rosa Parks of the North", who helped expose the northern states' problems with racial inequality of that time. Daisy Myers later wrote a book about her family's experiences. She died on December 5, 2011, in York, Pennsylvania. The NAACP and the ACLU opposed Levitt’s racist policies, and the Federal Housing Administration threatened to refuse mortgages on his next Levittown. Levitt still refused to sell to blacks, and developed plans for yet another whites-only Levittown—this one to be in Willingboro Township, New Jersey—while fighting legal challenges in New Jersey courts. Ultimately the U.S. Supreme Court refused to hear his case.

The community's otherwise placid exterior was again disturbed during the so-called suburban gas riots of June 1979 in the wake of the Camp David Peace Accords, which resulted in a second embargo by Arab oil-producing nations. The unrest occurred June 24–25, 1979, as lines swelled and tempers flared in the heart of Levittown at an intersection known as Five Points, a location then surrounded by six service stations, two of which were severely damaged by vandalism in the riots. The two days of riots made national headlines and were mentioned (although not directly by name) in the draft of an address to the nation that was to have been delivered by President Jimmy Carter on July 5, 1979.

A baseball team from Levittown won the Little League World Series in 1960. Levittown American beat an opponent from Fort Worth, Texas, to win the honor.

Of the five public pools built by Levitt & Sons and operated by the Levittown Public Recreation Association (LPRA), four were closed in 2002, with the exception being one located in the Pinewood section. LPRA Headquarters (and other landmarks) of this prototypical post-war suburb of sometimes mythic importance have been the focus of historic preservation efforts. Since 2002, studies have been underway to establish the Levittown Historic District.

Since its inception in 1988, the Bucks County St. Patrick's Day Parade has been held in Levittown. Every year, the parade steps off from St Joseph the Worker Church, and proceeds two miles (3 km) on New Falls Road to Conwell–Egan Catholic High School. St Joseph the Worker Church has since been torn down.

=== Levittown Shopping Center ===
Levittown Shop-a-Rama, the 1955 Levittown Shopping Center in Tullytown was a 60-acre L-shaped pedestrian mall at the edge rather than the center of Levittown, with two strips of stores faced the 6,000-car parking lot with a courtyard that had green spaces, benches, and entrances to the stores. The center's largest, anchor department store (Pomeroys, which was acquired by Boscov's) and other chain retailers such as Food Fair, Woolworth's, JC Penney, Kresge, Yards, Lobel's, W.T. Grant, Pep Boys, and Sears were Levitt-favored tenants.

The shopping center began a slow decline in the mid-1970s from which it never recovered with the building of the Oxford Valley Mall. The mall, located just north of Levittown, in Langhorne in Middletown Township, drew shoppers away from the older Levittown facility, given Oxford Valley's much larger size and enclosed shopping environment. In 2002, the redeveloped site of the Shop-a-rama was reopened as the Levittown Town Center. The completed facility contains 468,675 square feet (43,541.3 m^{2}) of retail space.

== Municipalities and sections ==
Map of the municipalities, school districts and original sections of Levittown; the thick gray lines are municipal borders.

Levittown is not an incorporated place, though efforts in the early 1950s were made to incorporate. Some Levittown residents feared that incorporation would lead to higher taxes, by robbing the prospective municipality of a commercial tax base.

The names of the streets within each section uniformly begin with the same letter that begins the name of the section in question except for the section of Green Lynne, which was not constructed by Bill Levitt. This plan offers a good clue as to where any particular street might be located. "X" and "Z" are not used for section or street names. As there are more than 24 section names, "road" is used for street names in sections to the west of Edgely Road, "lane" is used in those section to the east. Sections are surrounded by a "drive" with the same name as the section. For example, the Pinewood section is circled by Pinewood Drive, while Snowball Gate is surrounded by Snowball Drive. Some sections have their drive broken into multiple parts, with similar names. Forsythia Gate has Forsythia Drive North and Forsythia Drive South.

Almost all other roads or lanes in the sections connect on one or both ends to the drive of that section. In some sections, such as Goldenridge, the shape of the section prevents the drive from surrounding the section, or allowing all roads in the section from connecting to the drive. The drives of adjacent sections, are frequently connected with small connector streets. In addition, small connector streets are used to connect the section drive with a nearby main thoroughfare. The names of these small connectors typically start with one of the letters from the adjacent sections, and tend to have a name reminiscent of their purpose or their location. Some examples: Learning Lane connects Lakeside and Pinewood, and borders Walt Disney Elementary School. Short Lane connects Stoneybrook and Farmbrook. Not all small connector streets are named.

Red Rose Gate, Forsythia Gate, and Snowball Gate are collectively known as "The Gates". (These were the only sections without sidewalks so as to lend a more "executive" appearance to the neighborhoods.) Lakeside sits next to Levittown Lake. Thornridge has its upper half that sits on a ridge, that was found to have thorn bushes. Vermilion Hill is named after the color that the trees on its prominent hill turned in the autumn. Magnolia Hill is on a prominent hill. Mill Creek Falls is found next to a creek by the same name.

Levittown's 41 neighborhoods (locally called "sections") are found in parts of four separate municipalities:

=== Bristol Township ===
- Appletree Hill
- Birch Valley (mostly in Falls Twp.)
- Blue Ridge

Bloomsdale

- Crabtree Hollow
- Dogwood Hollow
- Farmbrook

Fleetwing Estates

- Golden Ridge
- Greenbrook
- Holly Hill
- Indian Creek
- Junewood
- Kenwood (small portion in Tullytown)
- Magnolia Hill (1 House in Falls Twp.)
- Mill Creek
- Oak Tree Hollow
- Orangewood
- Plumb Ridge
- Red Cedar Hill
- Stonybrook (small portion in Tullytown)
- Violetwood
- Whitewood
- Yellowood

=== Falls Township ===
- Birch Valley (small part in Bristol Twp.)
- Elderberry Pond
- Lakeside (mostly in Tullytown)
- Magnolia Hill (1 house in Falls Twp.)
- North Park
- Pinewood (small part in Tullytown)
- Thornridge
- Vermillion Hills
- Willowood

=== Middletown Township ===
- Cobalt Ridge
- Deep Dale East
- Deep Dale West
- Forsythia Gate
- Highland Park
- Juniper Hill
- Lower Orchard
- Quincy Hollow
- Red Rose Gate
- Snowball Gate
- Twin Oaks
- Upper Orchard

=== Tullytown Borough ===
These neighborhoods' populations are counted by the U.S. Census Bureau as residing within Tullytown only, not the Levittown CDP.

- Kenwood (mostly in Bristol Twp.)
- Lakeside (small part in Falls Twp.)
- Pinewood (mostly in Falls Twp.)
- Stonybrook (mostly in Bristol Twp.)

== Education ==
Middletown residents are served by public schools run by the Neshaminy School District. Bristol Township public schools are managed by the Bristol Township School District. Falls Township and Tullytown Borough residents are served by the Pennsbury School District.

Some students attend schools run by Catholic, Lutheran, evangelical Protestant and Quaker organizations, in and around Levittown.

== Geography ==
Levittown is located at 40°9′15″N 74°50′59″W. Levittown lies in the southern end of Bucks County ("Lower Bucks"), between Philadelphia and Trenton, New Jersey; Downtown Philadelphia ("Center City") is approximately 22 miles (35 km) away. It is part of the Philadelphia metropolitan area. It is adjacent to and nearly surrounds Fairless Hills, a suburban community more modest in scale, but that shares many of Levittown's characteristics.

According to the United States Census Bureau, the CDP has a total area of 10.2 square miles (26 km^{2}), of which 0.5 km^{2} (0.59%) is water. It has a humid subtropical climate (Cfa) bordering a hot-summer humid continental climate (Dfa) and average monthly temperatures in the central CDP range from 32.2 °F in January to 76.1 °F in July. The local hardiness zone is 7a.

=== Climate ===
Climate data for Levittown, PA
Month	Jan	Feb	Mar	Apr	May	Jun	Jul	Aug	Sep	Oct	Nov	Dec	Year
Mean daily maximum °F (°C)	38 (3)	42 (6)	50 (10)	60 (16)	71 (22)	79 (26)	84 (29)	82 (28)	75 (24)	64 (18)	54 (12)	42 (6)	62 (17)
Mean daily minimum °F (°C)	22 (−6)	25 (−4)	30 (−1)	39 (4)	49 (9)	58 (14)	64 (18)	63 (17)	55 (13)	43 (6)	36 (2)	26 (−3)	43 (6)
Average precipitation inches (mm)	3.5 (89)	3.1 (79)	4.8 (120)	5.5 (140)	5.2 (130)	4.6 (120)	5.4 (140)	3.1 (79)	3.2 (81)	3.8 (97)	5.1 (130)	3.2 (81)	50.5 (1,286)

== Transportation ==
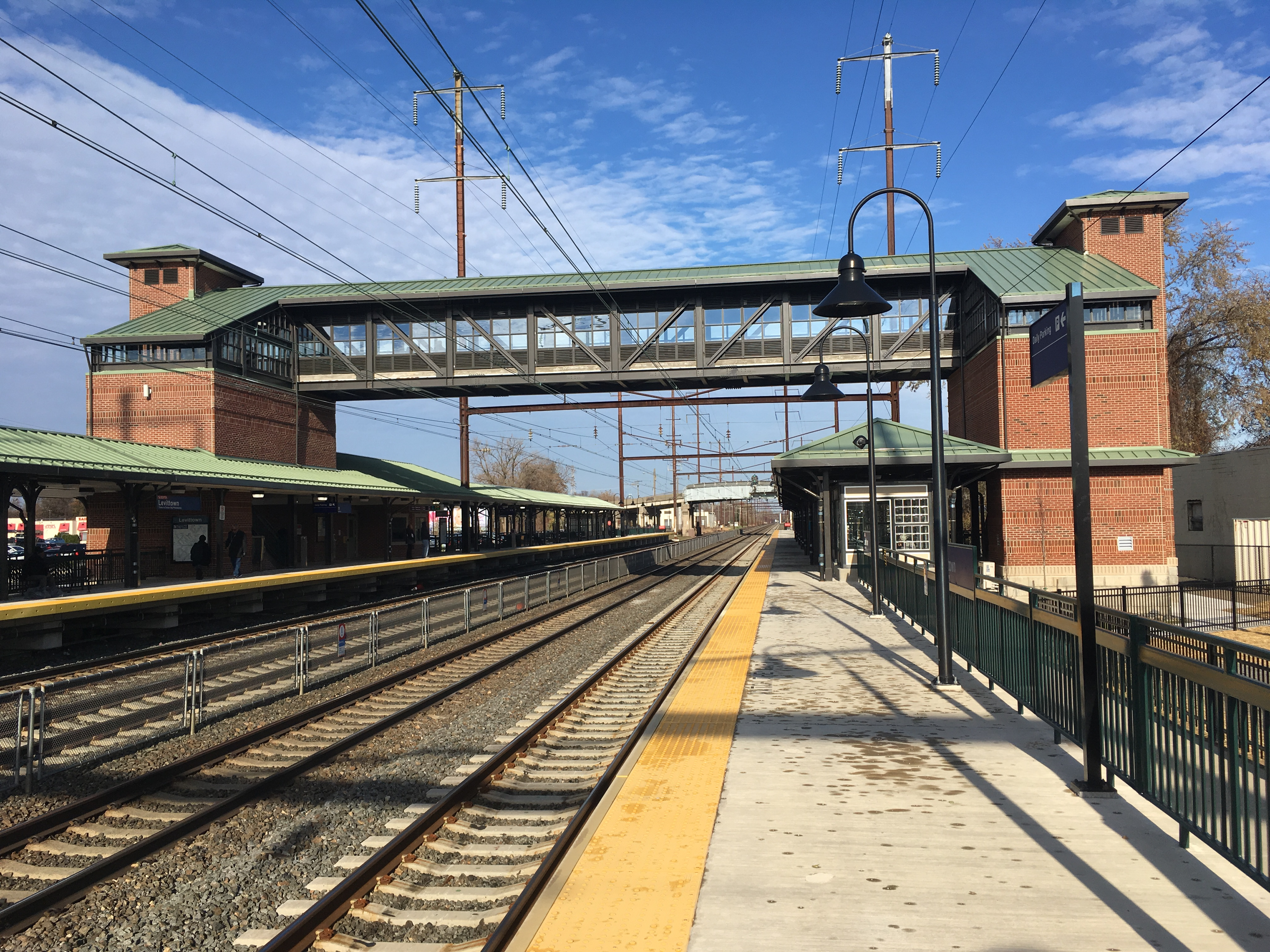
Levittown station on SEPTA Regional Rail's Trenton Line

SEPTA Regional Rail serves Levittown to the south at its Levittown station on the Trenton Line, and to the north at its Langhorne and Woodbourne stations on the West Trenton Line. Interstate 295 (I-295) runs to the north and west of Levittown, connecting it with the suburbs north of Trenton. The Pennsylvania Turnpike (I-95) runs southwest of Levittown, connecting it with Philadelphia, the western suburbs, and the New Jersey Turnpike. U.S. Route 1 (US 1) runs to the north, carrying traffic directly into downtown Trenton. The nearest international airport is Philadelphia International Airport (Airport Code PHL), approximately 34 miles (55 km) southwest of Levittown. The nearest Amtrak station is just across the Delaware River in Trenton at the Trenton Transit Center, just over 9 miles (14 km) to the east.

Though a steel mill once operated by U.S. Steel provided employment in Falls Township, many Levittown residents have historically commuted by automobile or train to Philadelphia, Trenton, Princeton and still others to more distant locales in as many as four states. Just over ten percent of employed Levittown residents both live and work in the community.

== Demographics ==
Historical population
Census	Pop.	Note	%±
1990	55,362		—
2000	53,966		−2.5%
2010	52,983		−1.8%
2020	52,699		−0.5%

=== 2020 census ===
As of the 2020 census, Levittown had a population of 52,699. The median age was 40.3 years. 21.6% of residents were under the age of 18 and 15.8% of residents were 65 years of age or older. For every 100 females there were 98.9 males, and for every 100 females age 18 and over there were 96.2 males age 18 and over.

100.0% of residents lived in urban areas, while 0.0% lived in rural areas.

There were 18,394 households in Levittown, of which 33.1% had children under the age of 18 living in them. Of all households, 54.1% were married-couple households, 15.4% were households with a male householder and no spouse or partner present, and 22.8% were households with a female householder and no spouse or partner present. About 19.5% of all households were made up of individuals and 8.9% had someone living alone who was 65 years of age or older.

There were 18,913 housing units, of which 2.7% were vacant. The homeowner vacancy rate was 1.1% and the rental vacancy rate was 4.4%.

Racial composition as of the 2020 census
Race	Number	Percent
White	43,187	82.0%
Black or African American	2,471	4.7%
American Indian and Alaska Native	105	0.2%
Asian	1,219	2.3%
Native Hawaiian and Other Pacific Islander	20	0.0%
Some other race	1,775	3.4%
Two or more races	3,922	7.4%
Hispanic or Latino (of any race)	4,431	8.4%

=== 2010 census ===
As of the 2010 census, Levittown was 87.7% White, 5.1% Hispanic or Latino ancestry of any race, 3.6% Black or African American, 1.7% Asian, 1.6% were two or more races, 0.3% were some other race and 0.2% Native American.

=== 2000 census ===
As of the 2000 census, there were 53,966 people, 18,603 households, and 14,510 families residing in the CDP. The population density was 5,309.5 inhabitants per square mile (2,050.0/km^{2}). There were 19,044 housing units at an average density of 1,873.7/mi^{2} (723.7/km^{2}). The racial makeup of the CDP was 94.4% White, 2.4% African American, 2.2% Hispanic or Latino of any race, 1.2% from two or more races, 0.95% Asian, 0.9% from other races, 0.2% Native American and 0.04% Pacific Islander.

There were 18,603 households, out of which 35.8% had children under the age of 18 living with them, 60.7% were married couples living together, 12.3% had a female householder with no husband present, and 22.0% were non-families. 17.8% of all households were made up of individuals, and 8.5% had someone living alone who was 65 years of age or older. The average household size was 2.89 and the average family size was 3.28.

In the CDP, the population was spread out, with 26.4% under the age of 18, 7.8% from 18 to 24, 30.4% from 25 to 44, 20.9% from 45 to 64, and 14.5% who were 65 years of age or older. The median age was 37 years. For every 100 females, there were 96.3 males. For every 100 females age 18 and over, there were 92.6 males.

The median income for a household in the CDP was $52,514, and the median income for a family was $57,220. Males had a median income of $40,411 versus $29,685 for females. The per capita income for the CDP was $20,047. About 3.1% of families and 4.6% of the population were below the poverty line, including 5.6% of those under the age of 18 and 3.5% of those 65 and older.

85.4% of Levittown residents ages 25 or older had at least a high school diploma, while 13.4% had at least a bachelor's degree.

== Notable people ==
- Keith Armstrong, current Special Teams coordinator for the Tampa Bay Buccaneers
- Susan Barnett, anchor of the CBS 3 Philadelphia evening news
- Anna Burger, Secretary-Treasurer of the SEIU
- Jim Cawley, Bucks County Commissioner and Lieutenant Governor of Pennsylvania
- David A. Christian, U.S. Army captain and decorated Vietnam veteran
- Rick DeJesus, musician
- Steven E. de Souza, Hollywood screenwriter and director
- Bob Zupcic, former outfielder for the Boston Red Sox
- Brian Fitzpatrick, U.S. Representative for the 1st District
- Mike Fitzpatrick, former U.S. Representative for the former 8th District
- Ross Gay, poet, essayist, and professor of English
- Eric Goldberg, Disney animator and director
- Mae Krier, veteran and advocate
- Steven Kunes, TV writer and producer
- Jeri Massi, evangelical Protestant author
- Joe McEwing, former Major League Baseball player
- Bill O'Neill, four-time All American ten-pin bowler for Saginaw Valley State University who is now competing on the PBA Tour
- Robert Schooley, creator of Kim Possible
- Mark Schweiker, Republican former Governor of Pennsylvania
- Steve Slaton, Former running back for the NFL's Miami Dolphins
- David Uosikkinen, drummer for rock band The Hooters
- Troy Vincent, former NFL defensive back, attended Pennsbury High School
- Earl "the Twirl" Williams, American-Israeli former professional basketball player

== See also ==
- List of sundown towns in the United States
