= Tullytown, Pennsylvania =

Borough in Pennsylvania, US

- Borough
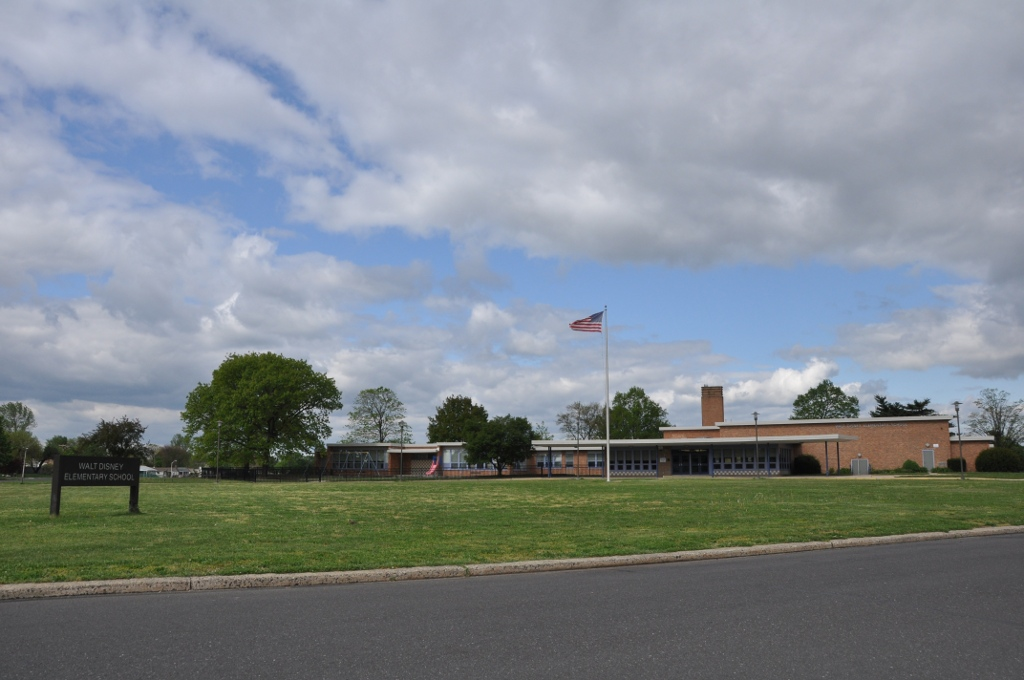
- Walt Disney Elementary School

- Location in Bucks County, Pennsylvania

- Location in Pennsylvania Location in the United States
- Coordinates: 40°08′42″N 74°49′04″W
- Country: United States
- State: Pennsylvania
- County: Bucks

Area
  - Total: 2.11 sq mi (5.46 km^{2})
  - Land: 1.52 sq mi (3.93 km^{2})
  - Water: 0.59 sq mi (1.53 km^{2})
- Elevation: 20 ft (6.1 m)

Population (2010)
  - Total: 1,872
  - Estimate (2019): 2,181
  - Density: 1,436.5/sq mi (554.62/km^{2})
- Time zone: UTC-5 (EST)
  - Summer (DST): UTC-4 (EDT)
- ZIP Code: 19007
- Area codes: 215, 267 and 445
- FIPS code: 42-77744
- Website: tullytownborough.com

Tullytown is a borough in Bucks County, Pennsylvania, United States. Originally a village in Falls Township, Tullytown was partitioned as a borough in 1891. As of the 2020 census, Tullytown had a population of 2,282. Part of Levittown is located in Tullytown.

== History ==
The Walt Disney Elementary School was listed on the National Register of Historic Places in 2007.

== Geography ==
Tullytown is located at 40°8′42″N 74°49′4″W (40.145077, −74.817841).

Wickus Sippus Creek passes through Tullytown.

According to the United States Census Bureau, the borough has a total area of 2.1 square miles (5.4 km^{2}), of which 1.6 square miles (4.1 km^{2}) is land and 0.5 square miles (1.3 km^{2}) (24.88%) is water.

== Demographics ==
Historical population
Census	Pop.	Note	%±
1880	262		—
1900	528		—
1910	622		17.8%
1920	572		−8.0%
1930	658		15.0%
1940	562		−14.6%
1950	648		15.3%
1960	2,452		278.4%
1970	2,194		−10.5%
1980	2,277		3.8%
1990	2,339		2.7%
2000	2,031		−13.2%
2010	1,872		−7.8%
2020	2,282		21.9%

As of the 2010 census, the borough was 92.5% Non-Hispanic White, 3.2% Black or African American, 0.2% Native American, 0.4% Asian, and 1.1% were two or more races. 3.0% of the population were of Hispanic or Latino ancestry.

As of the census of 2000, there were 2,031 people, 803 households, and 501 families residing in the borough. The population density was 1,289.2 people per square mile (497.8 people/km^{2}). There were 819 housing units at an average density of 519.9 per square mile (200.7/km^{2}). The racial makeup of the borough was 97.74% White, 1.48% African American, 0.05% Native American, 0.49% Asian, 0.10% from other races, and 0.15% from two or more races. Hispanic or Latino of any race were 1.38% of the population.

There were 803 households, out of which 29.0% had children under the age of 18 living with them, 46.7% were married couples living together, 10.3% had a female householder with no husband present, and 37.5% were non-families. 33.3% of all households were made up of individuals, and 19.3% had someone living alone who was 65 years of age or older. The average household size was 2.52 and the average family size was 3.24.

In the borough the population was spread out, with 24.5% under the age of 18, 7.9% from 18 to 24, 30.3% from 25 to 44, 20.4% from 45 to 64, and 16.9% who were 65 years of age or older. The median age was 39 years. For every 100 females, there were 92.9 males. For every 100 females age 18 and over, there were 90.6 males.

The median income for a household in the borough was $45,625, and the median income for a family was $57,917. Males had a median income of $35,774 versus $28,352 for females. The per capita income for the borough was $22,206. About 1.6% of families and 4.2% of the population were below the poverty line, including none of those under age 18 and 8.3% of those age 65 or over.

== Climate ==
According to the Köppen climate classification system, Tullytown has a humid subtropical climate (Cfa). Cfa climates are characterized by all months having an average mean temperature > 32.0 °F (0.0 °C), at least four months with an average mean temperature ≥ 50.0 °F (10.0 °C), at least one month with an average mean temperature ≥ 71.6 °F (22.0 °C) and no significant precipitation difference between seasons. Although most summer days are slightly humid in Tullytown, episodes of heat and high humidity can occur with heat index values > 108 °F (42 °C). Since 1981, the highest air temperature was 103.2 °F (39.6 °C) on July 6, 2010, and the highest daily average mean dew point was 75.3 °F (24.1 °C) on August 3, 2016. The average wettest month is July, which corresponds with the annual peak in thunderstorm activity. Since 1981, the wettest calendar day was 6.35 inches (161 mm) on August 27, 2011. During the winter months, the average annual extreme minimum air temperature is 1.6 °F (−16.9 °C). Since 1981, the coldest air temperature was −9.6 °F (−23.1 °C) on January 22, 1984. Episodes of extreme cold and wind can occur, with wind chill values < −9 °F (−23 °C). The average annual snowfall (Nov-Apr) is between 24 and 30 inches (61 and 76 cm). Ice storms and large snowstorms depositing ≥ 12 inches (30 cm) occur once every few years, particularly during nor’easters from December through February.

Climate data for Tullytown, Elevation 16 ft (5 m), 1981-2010 normals, extremes 1981-2018
Month	Jan	Feb	Mar	Apr	May	Jun	Jul	Aug	Sep	Oct	Nov	Dec	Year
Record high °F (°C)	71.8 (22.1)	77.9 (25.5)	87.8 (31.0)	95.1 (35.1)	96.0 (35.6)	97.3 (36.3)	103.2 (39.6)	101.1 (38.4)	98.8 (37.1)	89.2 (31.8)	81.5 (27.5)	76.1 (24.5)	103.2 (39.6)
Mean daily maximum °F (°C)	40.7 (4.8)	43.9 (6.6)	51.9 (11.1)	64.1 (17.8)	73.4 (23.0)	82.7 (28.2)	86.9 (30.5)	85.2 (29.6)	78.3 (25.7)	67.1 (19.5)	56.2 (13.4)	45.1 (7.3)	64.7 (18.2)
Daily mean °F (°C)	32.4 (0.2)	34.9 (1.6)	42.1 (5.6)	52.8 (11.6)	62.0 (16.7)	71.5 (21.9)	76.1 (24.5)	74.6 (23.7)	67.5 (19.7)	56.0 (13.3)	46.5 (8.1)	36.8 (2.7)	54.5 (12.5)
Mean daily minimum °F (°C)	24.1 (−4.4)	25.9 (−3.4)	32.4 (0.2)	41.6 (5.3)	50.6 (10.3)	60.4 (15.8)	65.3 (18.5)	64.1 (17.8)	56.7 (13.7)	44.9 (7.2)	36.8 (2.7)	28.5 (−1.9)	44.4 (6.9)
Record low °F (°C)	−9.6 (−23.1)	−2.5 (−19.2)	4.6 (−15.2)	18.1 (−7.7)	32.7 (0.4)	41.6 (5.3)	47.7 (8.7)	42.6 (5.9)	36.3 (2.4)	25.3 (−3.7)	12.1 (−11.1)	0.5 (−17.5)	−9.6 (−23.1)
Average precipitation inches (mm)	3.57 (91)	2.73 (69)	4.28 (109)	3.86 (98)	4.14 (105)	4.24 (108)	5.07 (129)	4.31 (109)	4.10 (104)	3.69 (94)	3.44 (87)	3.94 (100)	47.37 (1,203)
Average relative humidity (%)	65.2	61.5	57.8	57.0	61.9	65.9	66.2	68.6	69.3	68.5	66.9	66.8	64.7
Average dew point °F (°C)	22.0 (−5.6)	23.0 (−5.0)	28.3 (−2.1)	38.0 (3.3)	48.8 (9.3)	59.5 (15.3)	64.0 (17.8)	63.6 (17.6)	57.1 (13.9)	45.8 (7.7)	36.1 (2.3)	26.8 (−2.9)	42.8 (6.0)
Source: PRISM

== Transportation ==
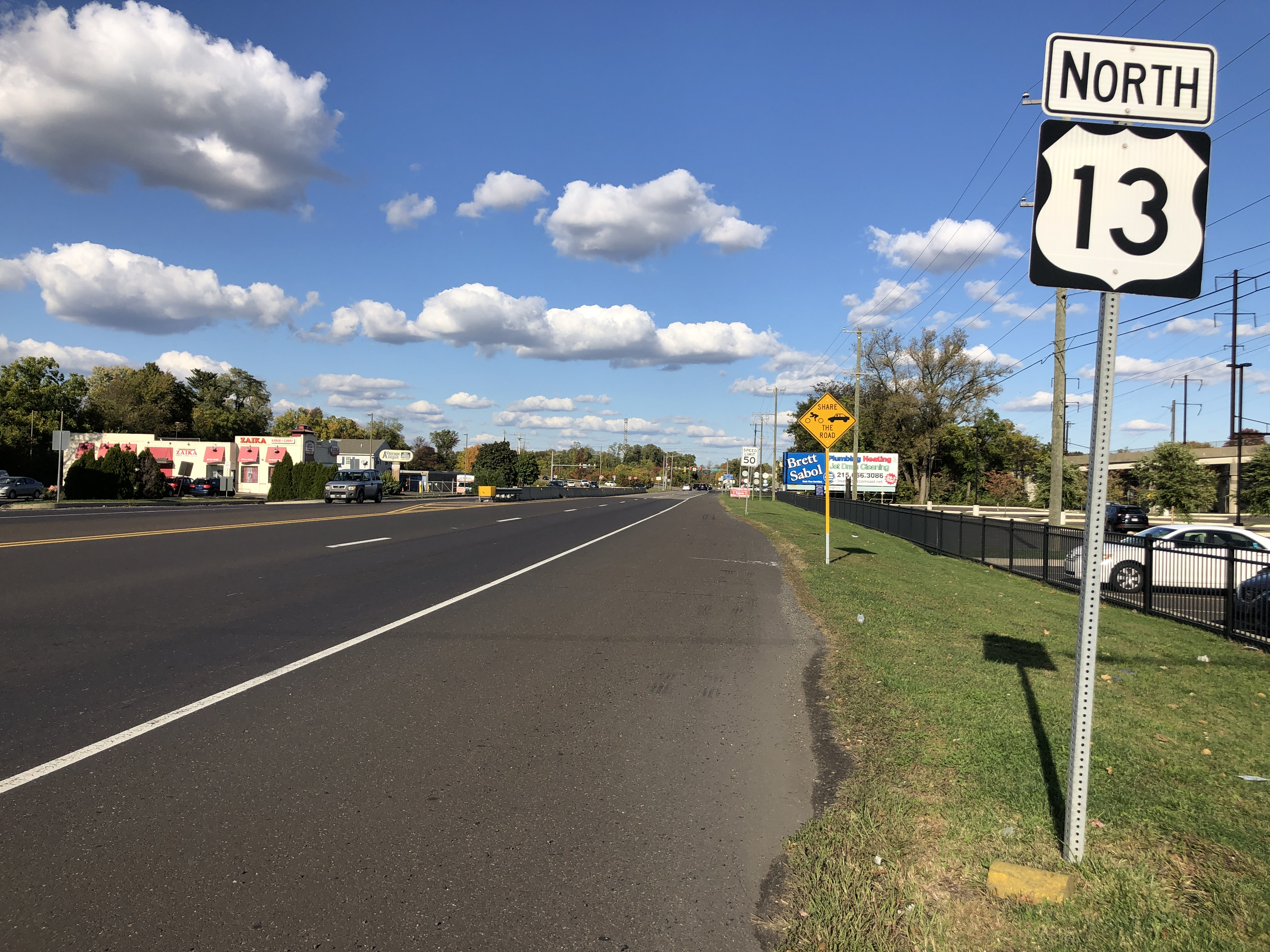
US 13 northbound in Tullytown

As of 2018 there were 12.98 miles (20.89 km) of public roads in Tullytown, of which 6.46 miles (10.40 km) were maintained by the Pennsylvania Department of Transportation (PennDOT) and 6.52 miles (10.49 km) were maintained by the borough.

U.S. Route 13 is the only numbered highway serving Tullytown directly. It follows a southwest-to-northeast alignment across the northwestern portion of the borough.

Tullytown is served by the Levittown station along SEPTA Regional Rail's Trenton Line that provides service between Center City Philadelphia and the Trenton Transit Center. Trains along Amtrak's Northeast Corridor pass through Tullytown but do not stop; the nearest Amtrak station is in Trenton. SEPTA provides Suburban Bus service to Tullytown along Route 127, which runs between the Oxford Valley Mall and the Trenton Transit Center, and Route 128, which runs between the Neshaminy Mall and the Oxford Valley Mall.

== Ecology ==
According to the A. W. Kuchler U.S. potential natural vegetation types, Tullytown would have a dominant vegetation type of Appalachian Oak (104) with a dominant vegetation form of Eastern Hardwood Forest (25). The plant hardiness zone is 7a with an average annual extreme minimum air temperature of 1.6 °F (−16.9 °C). The spring bloom typically begins by April 7 and fall color usually peaks by November 4.
