= Biles Island =

Coordinates: 40.175943°N 74.74905°W

Biles Island (Lenape: Minachkonk or Menahakonk) is an island that is located in the Delaware River in Falls Township, Bucks County, Pennsylvania.

== History ==
The island takes its name from William Biles, to whom it was conveyed in about 1680 "by four local Lenapes, Orecton, Nannacus, Nenemblahocking, and Patelana, for a total of ten pounds." The island was later known as Oreclan's Island.

Now owned by U.S. Steel, the 567-acre Biles Island sits in the Delaware River a half mile south of Trenton, New Jersey. Since at least 1968 it has been a dumping site for silt dredged from the river.

In June 2023, the Philadelphia, Pennsylvania district office of the United States Army Corps of Engineers announced that it had awarded a $12.9 million contract to Seaward Marine of Norfolk, Virginia "to conduct maintenance dredging of portions of the federal channel of the Delaware River" between the cities of Philadelphia and Trenton, New Jersey. The work was estimated to involve the dredging of "425,000 cubic yards of sediment from south of the Tacony-Palmyra Bridge all the way up to and including the Fairless Hills Turning Basin ... and ultimately moved to Dredged Material Placement Facilities (Palmyra Cove, Money Island, and/or Biles Island) along the river."
