= Falls Township, Bucks County, Pennsylvania =

Township in Pennsylvania, US

Falls Township
- Township
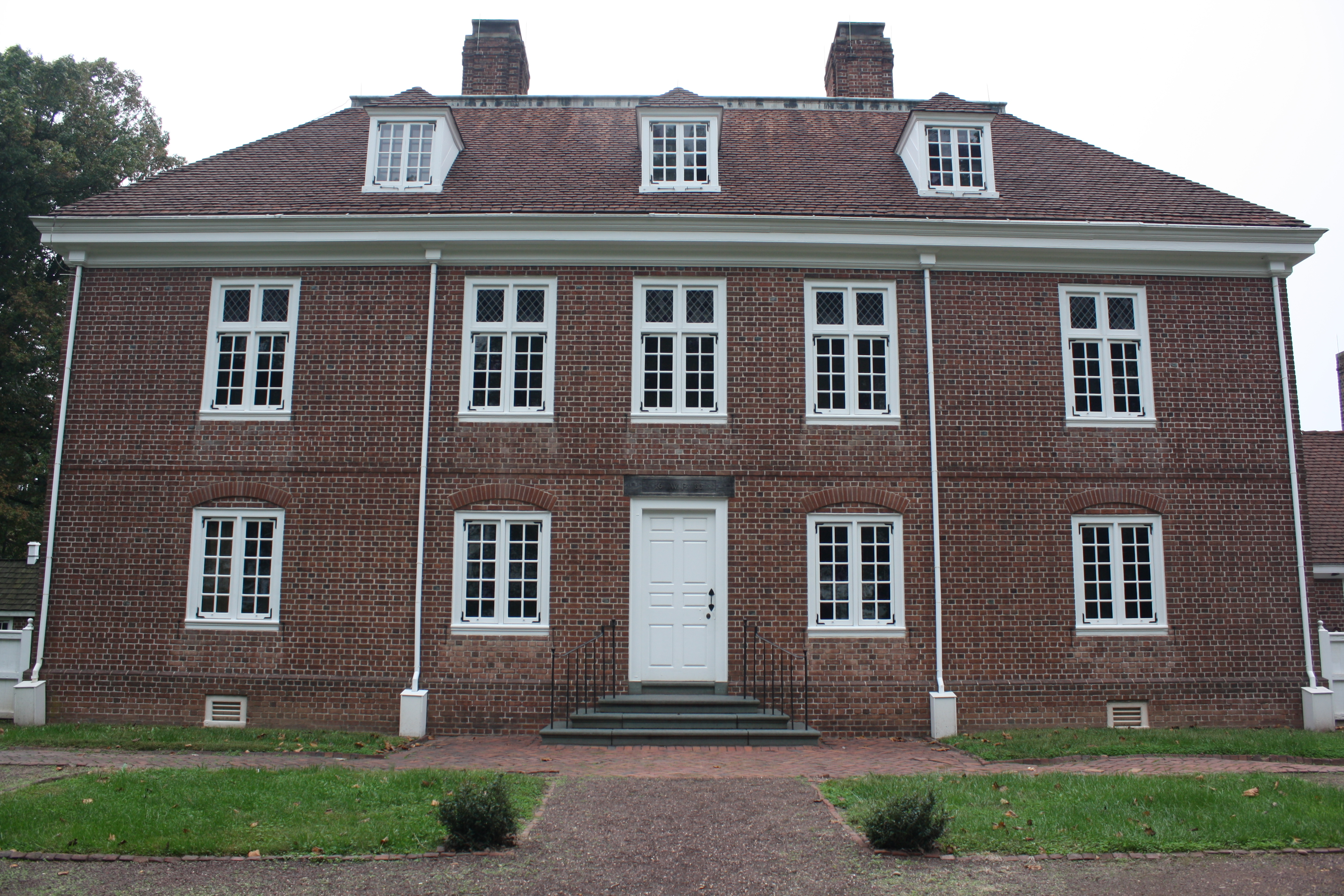
- Pennsbury Manor, a reproduction of William Penn's residence

- Flag Seal

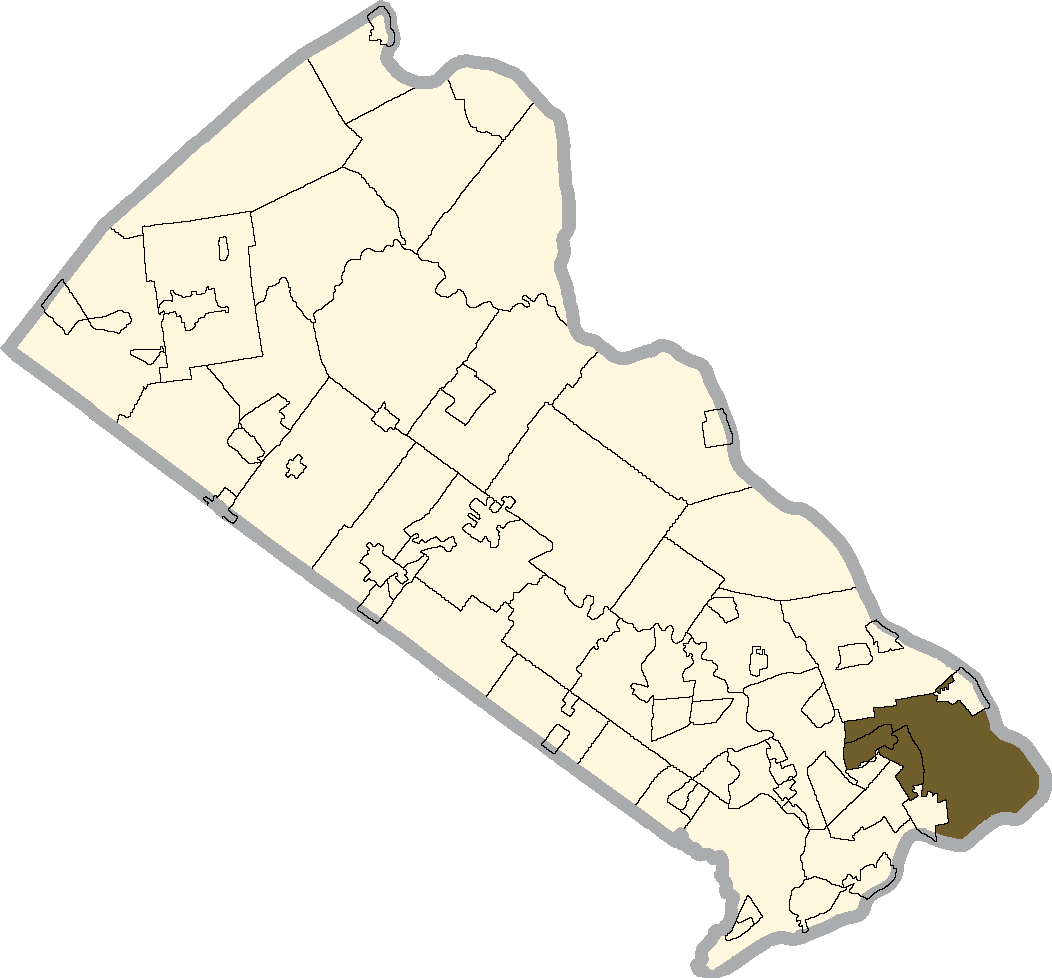
- Location of Falls Township in Bucks County

- Location in Pennsylvania and the United States Falls Township (the United States)
- Coordinates: 40°10′36″N 74°49′40″W
- Country: United States
- State: Pennsylvania
- County: Bucks
- Established: 1692

Area
  - Total: 26.58 sq mi (68.8 km^{2})
  - Land: 21.33 sq mi (55.2 km^{2})
  - Water: 5.25 sq mi (13.6 km^{2})
- Elevation: 69 ft (21 m)

Population (2010)
  - Total: 34,300
  - Estimate (2016): 33,714
  - Density: 1,610/sq mi (621/km^{2})
- Time zone: UTC-5 (EST)
  - Summer (DST): UTC-4 (EDT)
- Area codes: 215, 267 and 445
- FIPS code: 42-017-25112
- Website: www.fallstwp.com

Falls Township is a suburban Philadelphia township in Bucks County, Pennsylvania, United States. The population was 34,300 at the 2010 census. Portions of Fairless Hills and Levittown, Pennsylvania, are located in the township. Portions of Falls Township are called Morrisville and Yardley, due to the location of the Morrisville Post Office outside the Borough of Morrisville in Falls Township. As originally chartered in 1692, the villages of Morrisville and Tullytown were part of Falls Township. Morrisville was granted borough status in 1804. Tullytown was established as a borough in 1891.

== History ==
Delaware Canal in the township

Dutch settlements here were established as early as 1616. A number of colonists came to Falls Township before William Penn founded Pennsylvania in 1681, including William Biles.

Fallsington is the only settlement of this period which has been in continuous use. Fallsington is an example of a crossroads village typical of the time. The Bucks County Courthouse, established in 1683, is said to have been located in Fallsington until it was moved to Bristol in 1705. The Friends Meeting, whose first meetings were held at the home of William Biles on Biles Island, found a site for a brick meeting house, built about 1690 in Fallsington on 6 acres (0.024 km^{2}) of land that had been donated by Samuel Burges. Also in 1690, Thomas Janney donated 72 acres (0.29 km^{2}) of land to be used as the Quaker burial grounds for Falls Monthly Meeting. William Penn donated a tract of 120 acres (0.49 km^{2}), for a Falls commons. The township itself was established in 1692. Numerous villages were located within the township, with Fallsington being the center of social and commercial activity in the township. Morrisville was another prominent village, until it was partitioned as a borough in 1804. Tullytown was also a village until it was partitioned as a borough in 1891.

Villages and other place names, past and present, include Dogtown, Fairless Hills, Fallsington, Kildorpy, Kirkbridesville, Levittown, Morningside, Oxford Valley (located in both Falls Township and Middletown Township, Penns Manor, Penn Valley, Slickville, Tyburn, and Wheatsheaf.

The growth of Fallsington continued, with the construction of homes, an inn, public buildings, stores, and small craftsmen's shops. Until the construction of Fairless Hills and Levittown, it was the largest village in the township, and functioned for many years as a commercial center.

In 1682, William Penn began construction of his official residence, Pennsbury Manor. The 8,431-acre (34.12 km^{2}) site in Falls Township was chosen for its easy access to Philadelphia along the Delaware River. This island was gradually sold by Penn's heirs and the last original building was destroyed in 1864. In 1932, a small portion of the original site was purchased by Pennsylvania and reconstruction of Pennsbury Manor was begun. Pennsbury is now a historical site, open to the public. It was listed on the National Register of Historic Places in 1969.

The proximity of major transportation systems influenced much of the township's development. The earliest of these was the Delaware River. The township is located at the upper end of the navigable portion of the river. In 1686, the Provincial Council ordered the construction of the King's Highway, which ran from Philadelphia to Trenton along an existing Indian trail, through Bristol, Falls, and Morrisville. The King's Highway still exists today as U.S. Route 13, flowing closely the original configuration. Additional roads and turnpikes were built in the 18th and early 19th centuries.

Other transportation systems were laid out through Falls Township in the 19th and early 20th centuries. The Delaware Canal from Easton to Bristol was opened in 1832. A railroad line from Philadelphia to Trenton via Morrisville was built between 1833 and 1835. The rail line became part of Pennsylvania Railroad's main New York-Philadelphia line. The "West Trenton" cut-off of the Pennsylvania Railroad was built through the northern part of the township at the end of 19th century. These rail lines now accommodate SEPTA, Amtrak and Conrail passenger and freight between Philadelphia and Trenton.

== Geography ==
According to the U.S. Census Bureau, the township has a total area of 26.6 square miles (69 km^{2}), of which 22.3 square miles (58 km^{2}) is land and 4.3 square miles (11 km^{2}) (16.11%) is water. Natural features include Biles Island, Common Creek, Martins Creek, Mint Island, Queen Anne Creek, Scotts Creek, and Turkey Hill. Falls Township contains the easternmost point of Pennsylvania's southern half.

== Demographics ==
Historical population
Census	Pop.	Note	%±
1890	2,463		—
1900	1,856		−24.6%
1910	1,851		−0.3%
1920	1,789		−3.3%
1930	2,004		12.0%
1940	2,364		18.0%
1950	3,540		49.7%
1960	29,082		721.5%
1970	35,850		23.3%
1980	36,083		0.6%
1990	34,997		−3.0%
2000	34,865		−0.4%
2010	34,300		−1.6%
2020	34,716		1.2%

As of the 2010 census, the township was 84.1% Non-Hispanic White, 5.8% Black or African American, 0.2% Native American, 4.2% Asian, and 2.1% were two or more races. 4.4% of the population were of Hispanic or Latino ancestry

As of the census of 2000, there were 34,865 people, 13,170 households, and 9,403 families residing in the township. The population density was 1,565.0 inhabitants per square mile (604.2/km^{2}). There were 13,528 housing units at an average density of 607.2 per square mile (234.4/km^{2}). The racial makeup of the township was 90.22% White, 4.89% African American, 0.16% Native American, 2.58% Asian, 0.02% Pacific Islander, 0.77% from other races, and 1.37% from two or more races. Hispanic or Latino of any race were 2.35% of the population.

There were 13,170 households, out of which 35.1% had children under the age of 18 living with them, 54.5% were married couples living together, 12.1% had a female householder with no husband present, and 28.6% were non-families. 23.4% of all households were made up of individuals, and 9.0% had someone living alone who was 65 years of age or older. The average household size was 2.64 and the average family size was 3.15.

In the township the population was spread out, with 25.8% under the age of 18, 7.9% from 18 to 24, 31.8% from 25 to 44, 21.8% from 45 to 64, and 12.7% who were 65 years of age or older. The median age was 36 years. For every 100 females, there were 94.9 males. For every 100 females age 18 and over, there were 92.1 males.

The median income for a household in the township was $50,129, and the median income for a family was $57,033. Males had a median income of $41,200 versus $30,117 for females. The per capita income for the township was $22,376. About 3.7% of families and 5.5% of the population were below the poverty line, including 5.9% of those under age 18 and 4.8% of those age 65 or over.

== Transportation ==
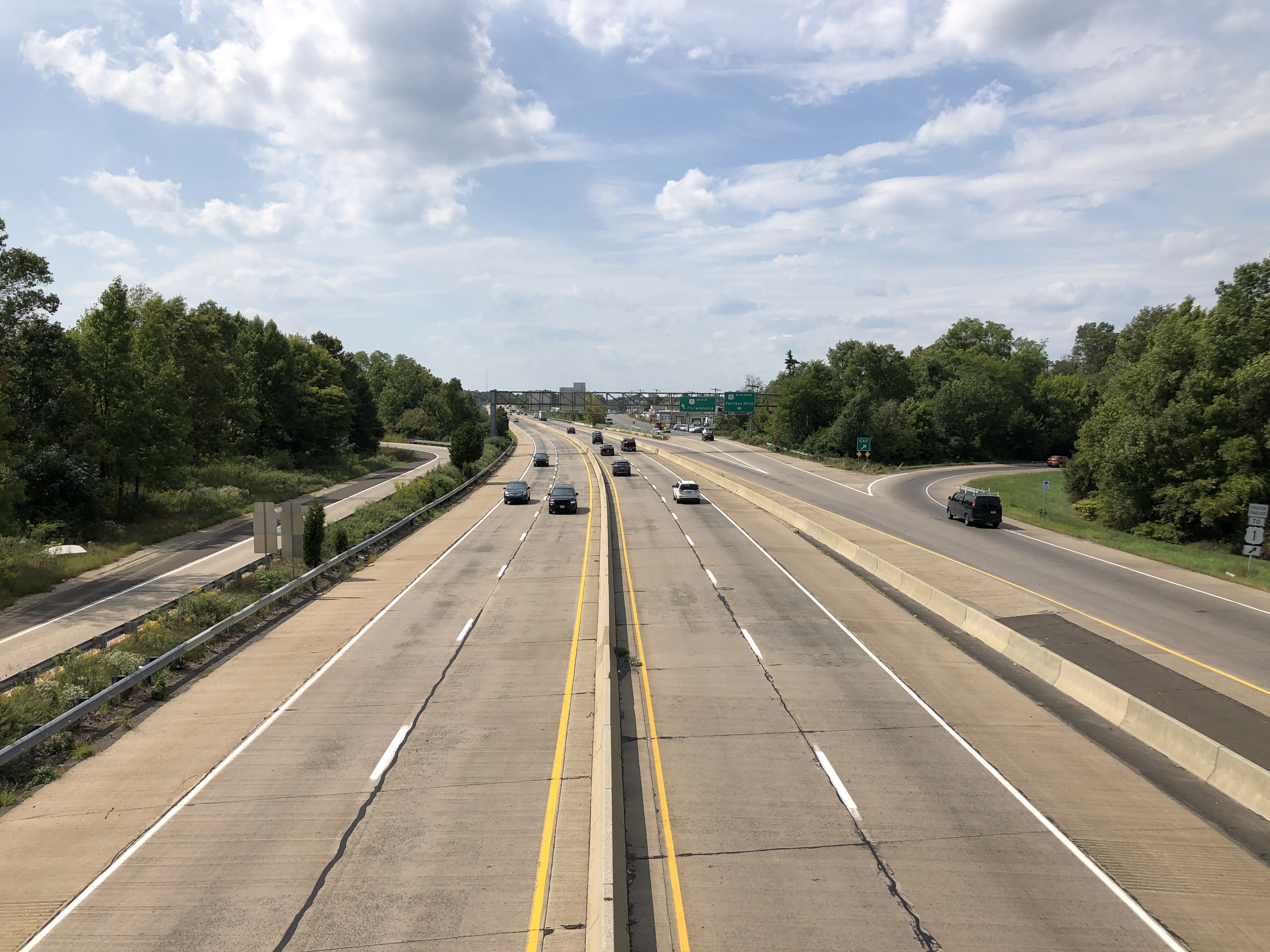
US 1 southbound at US 13 in Falls Township

As of 2019 there were 131.48 miles (211.60 km) of public roads in Falls Township, of which 45.60 miles (73.39 km) were maintained by the Pennsylvania Department of Transportation (PennDOT) and 85.88 miles (138.21 km) were maintained by the township.

U.S. Route 1 is the most prominent highway serving Falls Township, following a freeway along an east-west alignment across the northern portion of the township. U.S. Route 13 also follows a freeway through the township on a north-south alignment, terminating at US 1. U.S. Route 1 Business follows the Lincoln Highway to the south of US 1's routing in the northwestern section of the township. Pennsylvania Route 32 begins at the US 1 freeway in the northeastern section of the township, heading northeastward along Bridge Street.

SEPTA provides Suburban Bus service to Falls Township along Route 127, which runs between the Oxford Valley Mall and the Trenton Transit Center, and Route 128, which runs between the Neshaminy Mall and the Oxford Valley Mall. Amtrak's Northeast Corridor and SEPTA Regional Rail's Trenton Line pass through the township but do not have any stations within it. The nearest SEPTA Regional Rail stations are Levittown station and Trenton Transit Center, with the latter station also serving Amtrak and NJ Transit.

== Climate ==
According to the Köppen climate classification system, Falls Township has a Humid subtropical climate (Cfa). Cfa climates are characterized by all months having an average mean temperature > 32.0 °F (0.0 °C), at least four months with an average mean temperature ≥ 50.0 °F (10.0 °C), at least one month with an average mean temperature ≥ 71.6 °F (22.0 °C) and no significant precipitation difference between seasons. Although most summer days are slightly humid in Falls Township, episodes of heat and high humidity can occur with heat index values > 108 °F (42 °C). Since 1981, the highest air temperature was 103.4 °F (39.7 °C) on June 7, 2010, and the highest daily average mean dew point was 75.1 °F (23.9 °C) on August 13, 2016. The average wettest month is July which corresponds with the annual peak in thunderstorm activity. Since 1981, the wettest calendar day was 6.49 inches (165 mm) on August 27, 2011. During the winter months, the average annual extreme minimum air temperature is 1.6 °F (−16.9 °C). Since 1981, the coldest air temperature was −10.2 °F (−23.4 °C) on January 22, 1984. Episodes of extreme cold and wind can occur with wind chill values < −9 °F (−23 °C). The average annual snowfall (Nov-Apr) is between 24 inches (61 cm) and 30 inches (76 cm). Ice storms and large snowstorms depositing ≥ 12 inches (30 cm) occur once every few years, particularly during nor’easters from December through February.

Climate data for Falls Twp, Elevation 13 ft (4 m), 1991-2020 normals, extremes 1981-2018
Month	Jan	Feb	Mar	Apr	May	Jun	Jul	Aug	Sep	Oct	Nov	Dec	Year
Record high °F (°C)	71.8 (22.1)	78.1 (25.6)	87.9 (31.1)	95.1 (35.1)	95.8 (35.4)	97.2 (36.2)	103.4 (39.7)	101.1 (38.4)	98.7 (37.1)	89.3 (31.8)	81.4 (27.4)	76.1 (24.5)	103.4 (39.7)
Mean daily maximum °F (°C)	41.0 (5.0)	43.8 (6.6)	51.8 (11.0)	64.0 (17.8)	73.3 (22.9)	82.7 (28.2)	86.9 (30.5)	85.2 (29.6)	78.3 (25.7)	67.1 (19.5)	56.1 (13.4)	45.1 (7.3)	64.7 (18.2)
Daily mean °F (°C)	32.8 (0.4)	34.6 (1.4)	41.9 (5.5)	52.6 (11.4)	61.8 (16.6)	71.3 (21.8)	75.9 (24.4)	74.4 (23.6)	67.2 (19.6)	55.8 (13.2)	46.3 (7.9)	36.6 (2.6)	54.3 (12.4)
Mean daily minimum °F (°C)	24.6 (−4.1)	25.4 (−3.7)	32.0 (0.0)	41.2 (5.1)	50.3 (10.2)	60.0 (15.6)	64.9 (18.3)	63.6 (17.6)	56.2 (13.4)	44.4 (6.9)	36.4 (2.4)	28.1 (−2.2)	43.9 (6.6)
Record low °F (°C)	−10.2 (−23.4)	−2.6 (−19.2)	4.4 (−15.3)	18.0 (−7.8)	32.5 (0.3)	41.0 (5.0)	47.1 (8.4)	42.1 (5.6)	36.0 (2.2)	24.8 (−4.0)	11.3 (−11.5)	0.5 (−17.5)	−10.2 (−23.4)
Average precipitation inches (mm)	3.54 (90)	2.77 (70)	4.30 (109)	3.91 (99)	4.09 (104)	4.32 (110)	5.20 (132)	4.23 (107)	4.27 (108)	3.67 (93)	3.48 (88)	4.00 (102)	47.78 (1,214)
Average relative humidity (%)	65.1	61.7	58.0	57.0	62.1	66.1	66.4	68.6	69.8	68.5	66.9	66.8	64.8
Average dew point °F (°C)	21.7 (−5.7)	22.8 (−5.1)	28.2 (−2.1)	37.8 (3.2)	48.7 (9.3)	59.4 (15.2)	63.9 (17.7)	63.4 (17.4)	57.0 (13.9)	45.6 (7.6)	35.9 (2.2)	26.6 (−3.0)	42.7 (5.9)
Source: PRISM

== Ecology ==
According to the A. W. Kuchler U.S. potential natural vegetation types, Falls Township would have a dominant vegetation type of Appalachian Oak (104) with a dominant vegetation form of Eastern Hardwood Forest (25). The plant hardiness zone is 7a with an average annual extreme minimum air temperature of 1.6 °F (−16.9 °C). The spring bloom typically begins by April 8 and fall color usually peaks by November 3.
