= Daniel Wheeler =

English missionary (1771–1840)

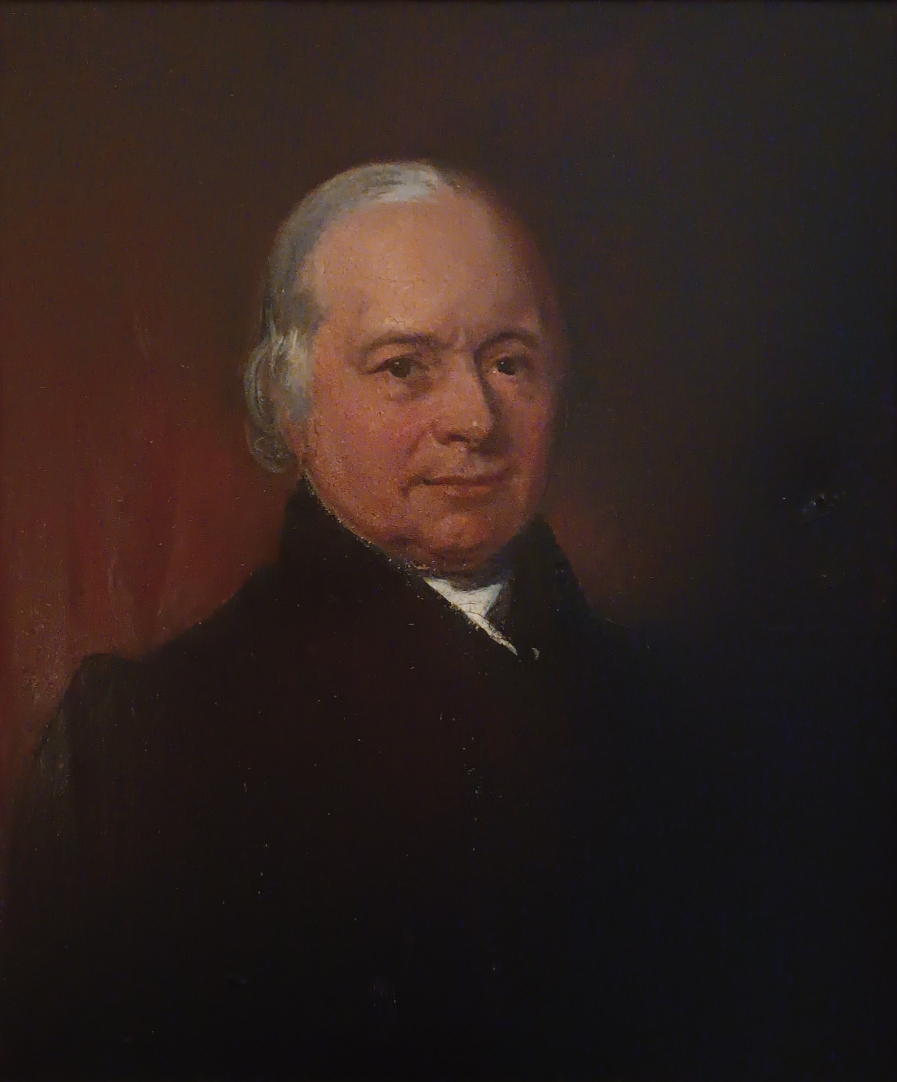
- Daniel Wheeler, c. 1840
- Born: November 27, 1771; London, England
- Died: June 12, 1840 (aged 68); New York City, United States
- Occupation: agriculturalist for Alexander I of Russia (1818-1832)
- Spouse: Jane Brady
- Children: 6

Daniel Wheeler (27 November 1771 – 12 June 1840) was a prominent English Quaker, minister, teacher and missionary in Russia and in the South Pacific.

As an agriculturalist, Wheeler played an important role in the history of St. Petersburg; he spent 14 years (1817–1832) draining the St Petersburg marshes of Okhta, Volkovka and Shushary. Thanks to him, land there became suitable for agriculture and development.

According to the society's Russian-language website, Daniel Wheeler and his family were one of the first Quakers in Russia.

== Biography ==
=== Early life ===
Daniel Wheeler was born on 27 November 1771 in London, to William and Sarah Wheeler, members of a well-to-do wine merchant family. Before his death in 1777, Daniel's father, William Wheeler, was attended by John Fothergill. This was Daniel's first encounter with Quakerism.

He was first educated at a boarding school at Parson's Green.

In 1783, following his mother Sarah's passing, a friend of the family offered Daniel a position on a merchant ship to Porto. Upon his return to London a year later, he joined the Royal Navy as a midshipman. On his first trip, the boat narrowly escaped shipwreck around the island of Grassholm, Wales. Wheeler was then transferred to a ship of the line. Six years later, Daniel returned to land. However, money ran out and further employment failed to appear.

In 1792, Daniel Wheeler enlisted as a private soldier and was sent to Ireland, an area of substantial political unrest at the time. A couple of years later, his regiment returned to the continent and fought in Hanover under the Duke of York during the Flanders campaign of the War of the First Coalition. The young soldier was promoted, and seemed set for a thriving career.

=== Conversion to Quakerism ===
However, in autumn 1795, as he was on his way to the West Indies with his regiment under Sir. Ralph Abercrombie, an epidemic broke out on the ship, and it was caught in a severe hurricane. Daniel was on the brink of death, and this episode forced him to rethink his entire life and goals. In 1796, as a result of this, he resigned from his position as an officer and went to live with his Quaker sister Barbara and her husband William Hoyland in Sheffield. There he founded a small seed merchant enterprise and settled in Handsworth Woodhouse near Sheffield. In 1790, he had already began going to Quaker Meetings, and feeling increasingly at home, was received as a member in 1798.

On 13 June 1800 he married Jane Brady, daughter of Thomas and Rachel Brady of Thorne, Yorkshire. In 1809, the growing family moved to a farm nearby. He had no farming expertise but his determination, hard work and capacity to learn, soon resulted in a prosperous business. By her he had four sons: William (d. 24 Nov. 1836, Isle of Wright), Joshua (d. 29 March 1841), Daniel (d. 1848), and Charles (d. 6 Feb. 1840). His elder daughter, Sarah (b. 15 July 1807), who afterwards married William Tanner of Bristol, survived him. Of his youngest daughter, Jane (d. 15 July 1837, Shushary), a short account was published in London and Bristol in 1841.

=== Work with the Russian Marshes ===
Daniel Wheeler had been unlikely to speak in meeting, but gradually this changed. In 1816, he was accepted as a Quaker minister and began preaching in his own meeting and then all over the country. According to legend, at the same time, he had the feeling that he would soon be called to missionary work abroad. In 1817, Wheeler described in his diary how his children were assembling a puzzle from a map of the world, and his son took a piece that depicted St. Petersburg, Russia. Daniel took this as a sign. During this period, Wheeler was also an agriculture teacher at William Singleton's boarding-school in Broomhall (founded in 1817), near Sheffield.

Meanwhile, during the war against Napoleon, Tsar Alexander I of Russia visited England and met the Quakers. Christoph von Lieven, the Russian ambassador, received information of the Emperor's desire to reclaim the marshes near St. Petersburg, and he was requested to make an inquiry for a suitable person to superintend the work. He wished the entrepreneur to be English and a member of the Society of Friends. Daniel volunteered, for he knew this was something he had to do. The letter from Alexander I concerning the marshes can be found in the Quaker archive in London.

In June 1817, Wheeler made an exploratory visit. He presented his plan to the Tsar, impressing him greatly and visited him at Kamenny Island Palace. He also gave Alexander a document outlining Quaker principles. The emperor appointed Wheeler to the post of Manager of Imperial Farms near St. Petersburg. Their strong friendship lasted until Alexander's death in 1825.

The following year, on 22 June 1818, Wheeler set sail from Hull to Kronstadt, this time with his wife Jane and their six children, two farm workers and their families, some cows, seeds and tools (20 members in total). George Edmondson, a tutor from Singleton's Broomhall boarding school came with them. The group settled in a farm brick house with 24 rooms that used to belong to Alexander Bezborodko. It was situated in the village of Okhta, on the banks of the Neva, opposite the Smolny Convent. The land was covered with moss, cowberry, bog plants and young fir trees. The remains of an old forest with decaying tree trunks could be found. It was believed that the forest had been destroyed in wars between Charles XII of Sweden and Peter the Great, as part of a bomb-shell and a Swedish axe were found during draining operations. Others thought it more likely that the trees had been destroyed for the building of St. Petersburg.

Their draining method was the following. The first step was to get rid of the abundant water. A wide, deep drain running into the river Okhta was dug all around the boundary. The plot was then intersected with smaller drains, cutting the land into fields of about eight acres each, while a connection between them and the main drain was carefully maintained. By these means, the surface became sufficiently dry to proceed. The next step was hacking up the moss as it retained moisture and then disinterring the tree roots. These would be allowed to remain until the following season to dry so that they might be lighter to carry.

Alexander I sent several soldiers to help clear the marshes and dig the network of ditches. He came several times to see for himself, and was delighted. The first harvest was in 1819, and was high quality and plentiful. Wheeler used modern English agricultural methods and sold his crops on the St Petersburg market. They soon began work on a second plot of land, in Volkova, south of St. Petersburg.

The winters were long, hard, and cold, and no reclamation work could be done. When they were not ill, the Wheelers taught their children and planned the following year. They held Quaker Meetings twice a week, often joined by British visitors to St Petersburg, including William Allen and Stephen Grellet.

Later, Daniel Wheeler developed a scheme to empower serfs, whose working conditions on the big estates nearby appalled him. He set up several small farms, and offered tenancies to former serfs, which were very successful. Wheeler also attempted to intervene in the life of his Russian workforce by building cottages for workers and giving them plots of land in return for a set payment – a plan inspired by the work of his friend William Allen in Sussex; but this project did not develop.

From 1826 to 1832, Daniel led work on the third plot, in Shushary, on the road to the Imperial summer residence at Tsarskoe Selo. During his 14 years around St. Petersburg, Wheeler cleared and drained 105,700 acres of swamps, and cultivated another 5000. Okhta and Shushary became model farms.

After that, Daniel Wheeler felt called to undertake mission work elsewhere. Wheeler's family remained in Shushary after his departure. His sons William and Daniel took over, and Jane stayed in Russia with them and her younger children Jenny and Joshua. In 1831, it is recorded that 500 employees worked under supervision of William Wheeler. In 1841, 30 farms were recorded on the spot.

In gratitude for their work, Tsar Nicholas I granted the Quakers a plot of land for a cemetery. Not long afterward Jane and Jenny died, and were buried there. Since then, all descendants of the missionary and grain merchant Daniel Wheeler are buried in that plot. Today, Quakers want to open a museum in the village and there are records of visits to the Wheeler family's graveyard after 1945.

=== Further travels ===
In 1825, Daniel Wheeler visited his friend William Allen in England. In 1833, he returned to Shushary.

In addition to his work in St. Petersburg, Daniel Wheeler was engaged in missionary work in North America, Oceania and Polynesia. Daniel’s son Charles accompanied his father on a trip (1833-1838) to Rio, Australia, Tahiti, the Sandwich islands, and back to Australia, where both met Quaker missionaries James Backhouse and George Washington Walker. Everywhere they went, father and son attended meetings and spoke about their faith.

=== Later years ===
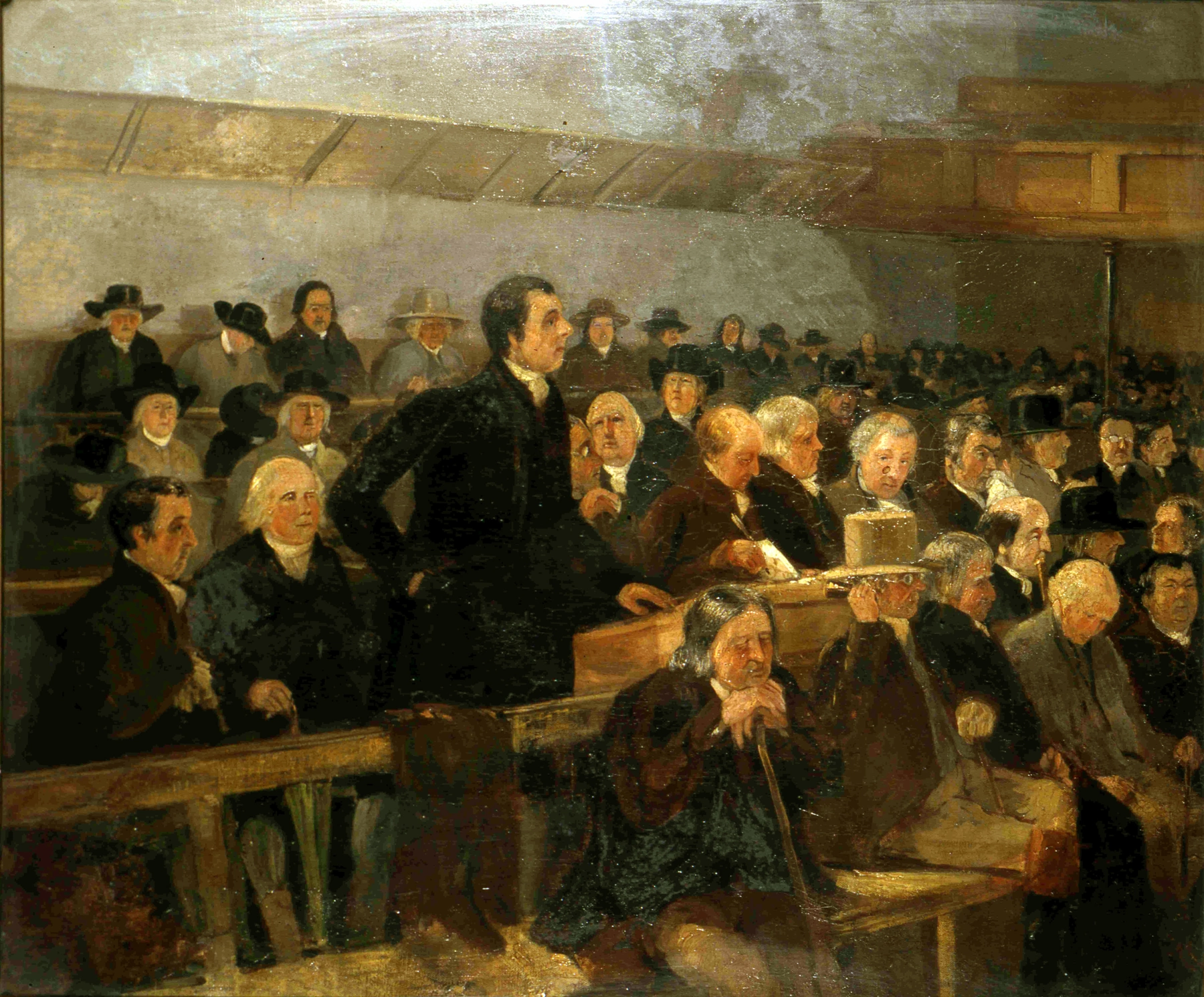
The London Yearly Meeting, circa 1840, by Samuel Lucas. Daniel Wheeler is the 5th person on the last row.

Daniel Wheeler returned to England in 1838, where he met Joseph John Gurney at the Yearly Meeting. He then travelled to Russia to visit his family and the graves of his wife and daughter. After that, he sailed alone to North America (his son Charles being too ill), and spent most of 1839 in Pennsylvania, Virginia, New England, Ohio and New York. Soon after his return to London, Charles died in Saint-Germain-en-Laye.

Daniel then made one last journey across the Atlantic, but fell ill on the voyage. Upon his arrival on 28 April 1840, he was nursed by a good friend John Olapp. However, he died on 12 June 1840 around midnight in New York City. On his tombstone it is written that he was from Shushary near Petersburg in Russia.

In the Encyclopaedia of America Quaker genealogy, it is indicated that Daniel Wheeler died on 15 June 1840, whereas contemporary sources cite this as the date of his burial.

== Legacy ==
In 1839, a book edition of his journal and letters (1836–39) from the Pacific were published in London.

In 1842, his Memoirs were published by his son.

Since 2014, Shushary, a suburb in the South of St. Petersburg, Russia (Вилеровский переулок; 59.811636, 30.360407), has an alley named after Daniel Wheeler, and the graves of his family members have been preserved.

In the 1960s, the Quaker burial ground in Shushary was rediscovered, when a delegation from the Society of Friends visited it. The area was revisited again in 2002 by participants in a Quaker-organized work-camp at Gatchina. In 2017, The 200th anniversary of Wheeler's draining of the marshes were marked by restoring this Quaker burial ground and consecration. The restoration of the grave was financed by the Pogosyan Grachya Charitable Foundation.

A portion of the Quaker Tapestry is dedicated to Daniel Wheeler. The panel depicts his draining of the marshes in St. Petersburg as well as an incident on Daniel's later voyage to the South Seas. It is said that a pod of large fish surrounded his ship during rough weather and broke the force of the waves until a storm abated. Wheeler's famous words inscribed on the tapestry "God's love enableth me to call every country my country and every man my brother" were written in 1818 in Okhta.

== Sources ==
Books

- Allen, William (1847). Life of William Allen with Selections from his correspondence, volume II. H. Longstreth.
- Grellet, Stephen (1867). Memoirs of the Life and Gospel Labours of Stephen Grellet. Vol. 1. H. Longstreth.
- Smith, Charlotte Fell (1899). "Wheeler, Daniel" . In Lee, Sidney (ed.). Dictionary of National Biography. Vol. 60. London: Smith, Elder & Co. pp. 437–438.
- Benson, Jane (1902). Quaker Pionniers in Russia (PDF). London: Headley Bros.
- Diamond, Augustus (1907). Daniel Wheeler. London: Headley Brothers.
- Wood, H. G. (1931). John William Hoyland of Kingsmead. London: Society for Promoting Christian Knowledge.
- Hinshaw, William Wade (1940). Encyclopedia of American Quaker genealogy, volume III.
- Scott, Richenda C. (1964). Quakers in Russia. Michael Joseph. ASIN B0006DA7X6.
