= John Yeats (economist) =

John Yeats (24 August 1822 – 14 June 1902) was an English economist and educationalist. He wrote and lectured on commerce, geography, history and science, founded a school in Peckham, London, and was an active fellow of the Royal Geographical Society and the Society for Arts, promoting vocational skills training for international trade.

== Biography ==
He was born in Gosberton, Lincolnshire to Sarah and John Yeats; his father was the minister of the General Baptist Church in Gosberton. He became a school teacher. He lived in Switzerland between 1844 and 1847, also spending time in the Netherlands and Germany. He taught at the agricultural school institutions of the pioneering Swiss educationalist, Philipp Emanuel von Fellenberg, at Hofwil, near Bern. Between the years 1847 and 1851 he had a residential post at George Edmondson's new Queenwood College, Hampshire, an experimental vocational scientific and technical school, again with an agricultural foundation, on land leased by the Society of Friends. Fellow teachers at the college were Irish physicist John Tyndall and English chemist Edward Frankland. Yeats's principal subjects were Geography and History. Tyndall admired Yeats' lectures but disliked him - he thought Edmondson used him to spy on the staff.

In 1851, following the Great Exhibition (of which the Society of Arts was a major influence), Yeats founded a private day and boarding school - "The Middle School" and later "The Upper School". Sited at 18-24 High Street, Peckham, it continued the mercantile theme, training boys for a commercial career; he resided there with his wife, Sarah, from Gresford. The school was advertised widely and students were of many nationalities. He invited or employed a variety of eminent guests and tutors, including general Giuseppe Garibaldi, poet Gottfried Kinkel, engineer Henry Bessemer and Lord Chancellor Henry Brougham - successful students received a medal with Brougham's profile. Using his fellowship of the Royal Geographical Society and the Society of Arts (both from 1854) he lectured on his economic researches and at the same time promoted the improvement of education in the United Kingdom, citing progress in other European countries and emphasising the practical, technical aspects of commerce in a broad-based education. In 1854, his only child, Sarah Ann, died. In September 1855, he read a paper, On Our National Strength, containing an analysis of economic data, to the British Association for the Advancement of Science at its Glasgow meeting. In 1859, he became a Doctor of Letters through the University of Glasgow.

His school was a business success, making him wealthy. Aside from other works, from 1871, four referential and instructional volumes on international commerce - the first of their kind in the UK - which he'd begun in the 1860s, were published under collective titles: Technical, Industrial and Trade Education and later Manuals of Commerce, Technical, Industrial and Commercial. They ran to different editions and overseas reprints/translations: by 1887, the modified and expanded works were sold as part of a set. In 1873, he sold his school to a Mr. Lydgate and moved to 7 Beaufort Square in Chepstow. He was a vocal advocate for free trade, lecturing widely on the subject. He was well known in local communities and continued to be active in commercial, scientific and educational matters. In 1885, he presided over the foundation of the "Chepstow Working Men's Liberal Association and Club". He was a regular contributor to the Journal of the Society of Arts for nearly 50 years, an inaugural member of the Society's standing committee on technical education and its examiner in commercial geography from 1874 to 1888.

Sarah Yeats died in 1886 and, aged 65, he married Catherine Chapman, aged 50, from Tidenham on 4 August 1887. After some years of frailty he died at home in Chepstow in 1902 following a suspected seizure. He was interred in Nunhead Cemetery alongside his first wife and child. His second wife died shortly afterwards on 14 June 1902.

=== Published works ===
- On Our national strength; tested by the numbers, the ages, and the industrial qualifications of the people. 1855, Journal of the Statistical Society of London, volume 18, no. 1201, pp. 367–377
- On the National Exodus; its consequences and its cure, etc. 1865, London
- The technical history of commerce, or skilled labour applied to production, assisted by several scientific gentlemen. 1871, Cassell, Peter & Galpin, London/1872, Virtue & Co., London [then revised] The technical history of commerce; or, The progress of the useful arts. 1887, G.Philip & Son, London
- Aspects and prospects of technical education. 1872
- The natural history of the raw materials of commerce : with a copious list of commercial terms, and their synonyms in several languages. 1871, Cassell, Petter, and Galpin, London/ 1872 Virtue & Co. London/ 1878, Scribner, Welford & Armstrong, New York [then revised] The natural history of the raw materials of commerce. Illustrated by synoptical tables, and a folio chart; a copious list of commercial products and their synonyms in the principal European and Oriental languages; a glossary and an index; with an industrial map printed in colours. 1887, G. Philip & Son
- The Growth and vicissitudes of commerce. From B.C. 1500 to A.D. 1789; an historical narrative of the industry and intercourse of civilised nations. Assisted by Several Scientific Gentlemen. 1872, Virtue & Co., London/Scribner, Welford, & Armstrong, New York, 1878 [then revised] The growth and vicissitudes of commerce in all ages [etc.] 1887, G. Philip & Son, London
- A Manual of Recent and Existing Commerce from the Year 1789 to 1872: Showing the Development of Industry at Home and Abroad During the Continental System, the Protectionist Policy, and the Era of Free Trade Scribner, Welford, & Armstrong, New York, 1878
- Recent and existing commerce, with statistical supplement. Maps showing trade-areas, and tabulated list of places important in business or trade. 1887, G.Philip & Son, London 3rd. Edition
- On Commercial Training: a paper read in the Educational Department of the Social Science Congress held at Norwich ... Reprinted from the "Eastern Daily Press" with a few additions 1873, E. Newman, London
- Guilds and their functions. Journal of the Society of Arts, 31 January 1873, pp. 178–189 London
- How can Professional and Technical Instruction be best incorporated with a sound system of general education? 1876, T.P. Newman, London
- On the Existing Commercial Depression; in its relation to production, manufacture, and trade. 1876, Lee & Co., Liverpool
- On middle class education in Holland. The Journal of the Society of Arts, 2 March 1877, Vol. 25, No. 1267 pp. 291–320
- Higher commercial education. A paper read before the Society of Arts. February 1878, London
- Reciprocity at home and abroad. A paper read before the Monmouthshire Chamber of Agriculture. 2 April 1879, C.H. Oliver, Newport
- Commercial Instruction: map studies of the mercantile World: auxiliary to our foreign and colonial trade, and illustrative of part of the science of commerce. 1890, G. Philip & Son, London
- Commercial Instruction: the golden gates of trade with our home industries; introductory to a study of mercantile economy and of the science of commerce. 1890, G. Philip & Son, London.
