= George Edmondson =

George Edmondson may refer to:

- George Edmondson (baseball) (1896–1973), Major League Baseball pitcher
- George Edmondson (educationalist) (1798–1863), English educationalist
- George Edmondson Jr. (1922–2019)

== See also ==
- George Edmundson (1848–1930), clergyman and historian
