= John Yeats =

John Yeats may refer to:

- John Butler Yeats, Irish artist and father of W. B. Yeats
- John Yeats (economist), English economist and educationalist

== See also ==
- John Yeates, Australian rules footballer
- John Stuart Yeates, New Zealand academic and botanist
