= Arthur Sansom =

Arthur Sansom may refer to:

- Art Sansom (1920–1991), American comic strip cartoonist
- Arthur Ernest Sansom (1838–1907), English physician
