= Moist heat sterilization =

Sterilization technique

Moist heat sterilization describes sterilization techniques that use hot water vapor as a sterilizing agent. Heating an article is one of the earliest forms of sterilization practiced. The various procedures used to perform moist heat sterilization process cause destruction of micro-organisms by denaturation of macromolecules.

== Description ==
Heating an article is one of the earliest forms of sterilization practiced. Moist heat sterilization processes sterilize using hot air that is heavily laden with water vapor, which plays the most important role in the sterilization. Boiling a sample for 30 minutes or more will kill virtually all vegetative cells present, but will not kill spores, which can germinate shortly thereafter and resume growth. Therefore, boiling is an insufficient method to achieve sterilization.

== Action on micro-organisms ==
Moist heat causes destruction of micro-organisms by denaturation of macromolecules, primarily proteins. Destruction of cells by lysis may also play a role. While "sterility" implies the destruction of free-living organisms which may grow within a sample, sterilization does not necessarily entail destruction of infectious matter. Prions are an example of an infectious agent that can survive sterilization by moist heat, depending on conditions.

== Validation ==
To facilitate efficient sterilization by steam and pressure, there are several methods of verification and indication used; these include color-changing indicator tapes and biological indicators. When using biological indicators, samples containing spores of heat-resistant microbes such as Geobacillus stearothermophilis are sterilized alongside a standard load, and are then incubated in sterile media (often contained within the sample in a glass ampule to be broken after sterilization). A color change in the media (indicating acid production by bacteria; requires the medium to be formulated for this purpose), or the appearance of turbidity (cloudiness indicating light scattering by bacterial cells) indicates that sterilization was not achieved and the sterilization cycle may need revision or improvement.

== Methods used ==
=== Tyndallization ===
A more effective method is Tyndallization, which uses three successive steam treatments to achieve sterilization over the course of three days. This works by killing vegetative cells, allowing germination of surviving spores, and killing the resulting vegetative cells before they have time to form further spores. Any surviving spores from the first treatment, or incidentally formed spores during the first incubation period, are killed in a third steaming cycle.

=== High pressure ===
A more commonly used method when extended heat is not a concern is to use an autoclave or pressure cooker. When sterilizing in this way, samples are placed into a steam chamber on a shelf or raised floor, and the chamber is closed and heated so that steam forces air out of the vents or exhausts. Pressure is then applied so that the interior temperature reaches 121 °C (250 °F), and this temperature is maintained for between 15 and 30 minutes. This elevated temperature and pressure is sufficient to sterilize samples of any commonly encountered microbes or spores. The chamber is then allowed to cool slowly or by passive heat dissipation; it is rare for forced cooling to be applied, or for pressure to be vented deliberately. Pressure sterilization is the prevailing method used for medical sterilization of heat-resistant tools, and for sterilization of materials for microbiology and other fields calling for aseptic technique.

In cases when items need to be sterilized for immediate use, flash sterilization may be employed. Flash techniques generally run for the minimum time, temperature, or pressure, and may sacrifice some safeguards, such as the abilities to validate with biological indicators or prevent contamination. Additional protocols are generally taken to mitigate the sacrifices; flash sterilization equipment is often kept in an operating room's sterile field, steam-penetrative protective packaging may be used to prepackage items, and specially designed rigid sterilization container systems can be reused.

== See also ==
- Sterility assurance level
