= Tyndall Glacier (Colorado) =

Glacier in Colorado, United States

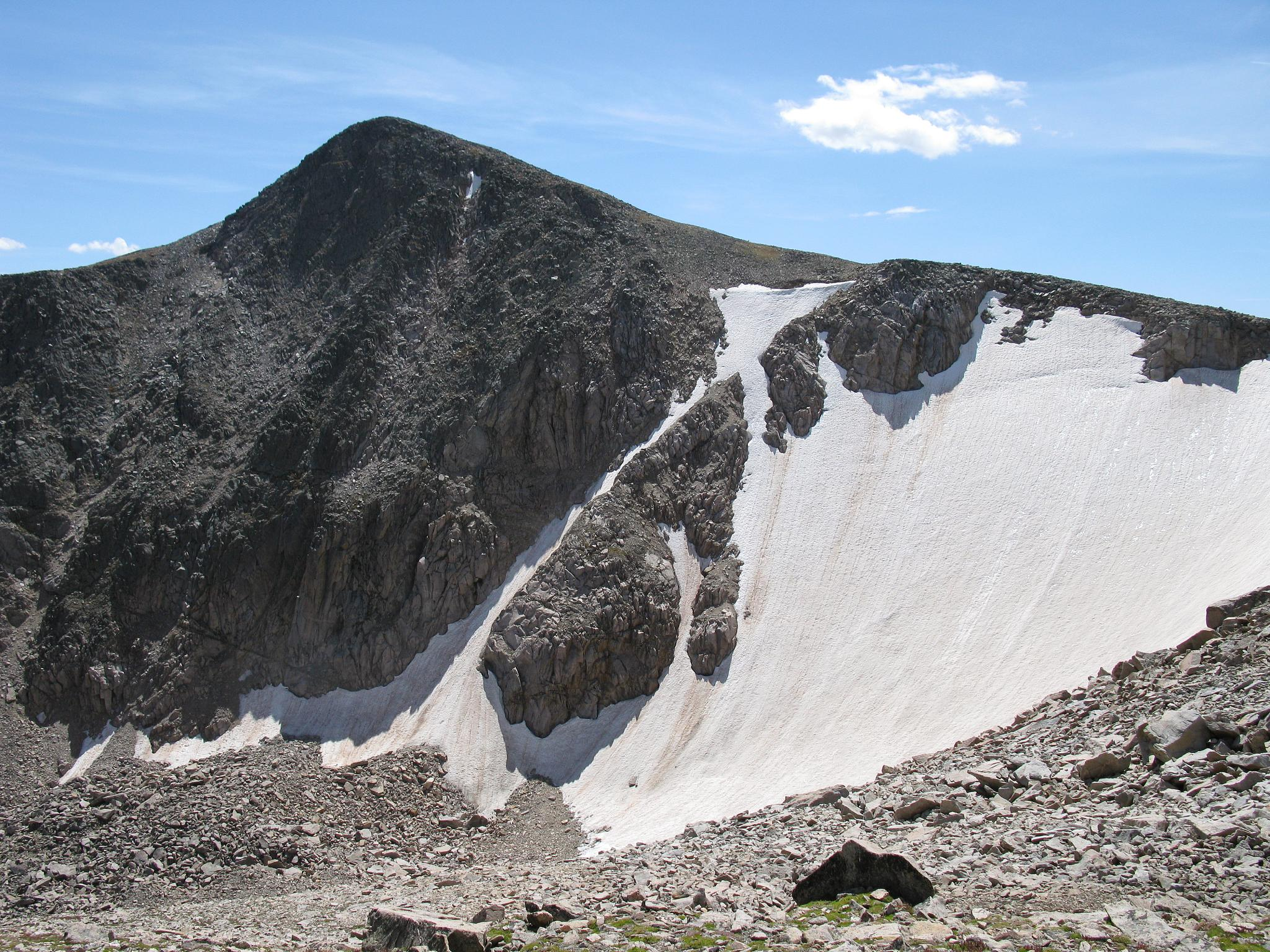
- Hallett Peak and Tyndall Glacier

- Location within Colorado
- Type: Cirque glacier
- Location: Larimer County, Colorado, United States
- Coordinates: 40°18′19″N 105°41′22″W
- Terminus: Talus
- Status: Retreating

Tyndall Glacier is a small cirque glacier in Rocky Mountain National Park in the U.S. state of Colorado. Tyndall Glacier is on the east side of the Continental Divide and in a cirque to the north of Hallett Peak. Tyndall Glacier is both an ice and a rock glacier, with the lower portions of the glacier being composed primarily of rock debris and a small portion of ice.

Tyndall Glacier is named after John Tyndall, an Irish scientist and Alpine mountaineer who in 1861 first ascended the Weisshorn in 1861. He also made an early attempt on the Matterhorn prior to its first ascent. In 1861, Tyndall identified carbon dioxide as a heat-trapping greenhouse gas; the glacier that bears his name appears to be retreating.

== See also ==
- List of glaciers in the United States
