= Shushary =

Shushary (Russian: Шушары) is the name of several inhabited localities in Russia:

Urban localities

- Shushary, Saint Petersburg, a municipal settlement in Pushkinsky District of the federal city of St. Petersburg

Rural localities

- Shushary, Sverdlovsk Oblast, a village in Shalamovsky Selsoviet of Baykalovsky District in Sverdlovsk Oblast
- Shushary, Republic of Tatarstan, a village in Vysokogorsky District of the Republic of Tatarstan
