= Queenwood College =

Former school in Stockbridge, Hampshire, England

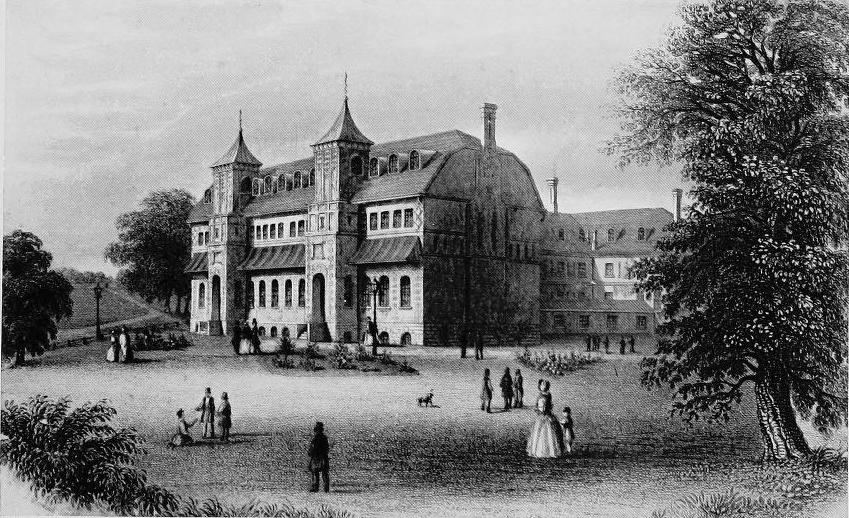
Queenwood College

Queenwood College was a British Public School, that is an independent fee-paying school, situated near Stockbridge, Hampshire, England. The school was in operation from 1847 to 1896.

== History of the site ==
In 1335 Edward III gave the Manor of East Tytherley to his wife, Queen Philippa, who moved her London court there to escape the Black Death. She and her court remained there until her death in 1369. In the 15th century the manor was known as Queen's Court. In 1654 Francis Rolle purchased the manor and it remained in the Rolle family until 1801. Queenwood Farm, famous for its yew trees, with some adjoining land was leased to Robert Owen in 1839 by Sir Isaac Goldsmid for 99 years at a low rent. Owen erected a large H-shaped, three-storey, brick-and-flint building on the leaseholding and named it "Harmony Hall". The architect was Joseph Hansom, architect of Birmingham Town Hall. Owen attempted to create a pioneering socialist project in community living. There was an elementary school, started in early 1843, which in May 1844 had 94 pupils. By 1845 the communitarian pioneers were bankrupt. On the Little Bentley Farm adjoining the site of Harmony Hall, William Galpin set up a small community of vegetarian socialists, who were mostly ex-colonists of the Harmony Hall Community. By 1846 Galpin's project was also bankrupt.

== History of the college ==
George Edmondson, sponsored by the Society of Friends, leased Queenswood Farm in 1847 and opened a Quaker school named "Queenwood College". This was an experimental school dedicated to science teaching. In the first quarter-century of its operation the college had several notable scientists on its staff. Thomas Archer Hirst, Heinrich Debus, and Robert Galloway served on the college staff. John Tyndall and Edward Frankland were science-masters there for about a year in 1847–48 before leaving together to study in Germany. Economist John Yeats was another master. The college taught students until 1896 and then closed. The buildings of the college burnt down in 1902, and all of the buildings connected with the college were demolished in 1904. Since then, Queenwood Farm has been used for agriculture. Upon Edmondson's death in 1863, Charles Willmore ran the school and stayed on, with his family, at Queenwood when the college closed; he died in the 1902 fire.

== Notable alumni ==
- Sir Whately Eliot — engineer, Kt., cr. 1907
- Tristram Ellis — artist
- Henry Fawcett — economist, politician, rector of Glasgow University, PC
- Walter Flight — mineralogist, FRS
- Thomas Fox — cricketer and dermatologist
- Sir Thomas Glen-Coats, 1st Baronet — industrialist and politician
- John Hopkinson — physicist, electrical engineer, FRS
- W. G. Vawdrey Lush — surgeon, FRCS, FRCP
- Arthur Ernest Sansom — physician, FRCP
