= Calorescence =

Calorescence is a term describing the process whereby matter absorbs infrared radiant energy and emits visible radiant energy in its place. For example, some kinds of flammable gas give off large amounts of radiant heat and very little visible light when burning, and if a piece of metal is placed into such a flame, the metal will become bright red-hot—which is to say the metal absorbs invisible infrared and emits visible radiation. The word calorescence was coined by John Tyndall in 1864 on the model of the word fluorescence which had been coined in 1852. At that time, fluorescence was defined as absorption in the ultraviolet part of the spectrum followed by emission in the visible part of the spectrum. Calorescence was defined complementarily as absorption in the infrared followed by emission in the visible. Earlier, George Stokes had shown the reverse phenomenon: the emission of infrared following the absorption of visible light.

The following is a laboratory demonstration of calorescence. An ordinary lightbulb emits much infrared light. Carbon disulfide is a colorless liquid transparent to both infrared and visible. Iodine readily dissolves in this liquid and causes the liquid to turn a black color and to become completely opaque to visible light, given enough iodine. At the same time, however, the iodine has essentially no effect on the transparency of the liquid with respect to infrared light. Hence when light from an ordinary lightbulb is passed through a body of this solution, much infrared and only infrared emerges out at the other side. This infrared light can be brought to a focus with a concave mirror (or an optical lens made from rock-salt, but not a lens made from glass because glass is a poor transmitter of infrared). At the point of focus, with a good focusing tool, the infrared beam is strong enough to set paper on fire. If a little piece of non-combustible solid material is placed at the focus, it will glow visibly in the heat; i.e. the material will absorb infrared and emit visible light.

The following is another laboratory illustration of calorescence. In a flame of pure hydrogen burning in oxygen, the hydrogen chemically combines with the oxygen to form water (H_{2}O) plus a lot of heat is produced. This heat is a radiant emission from the newly formed water molecules. That is, the heat is thermal radiation whose particular set of radiant frequencies is uniquely characteristic of water molecules, as determined by emission spectroscopy. Water molecules have very little emission in the visible portion of the spectrum at any temperature (cf. spectral absorption of water). The temperature of the hydrogen flame is more than 2000 degrees Celsius. If a piece of platinum is placed in the flame, the platinum will become "white hot" and give out a bright light. The platinum thus absorbs radiation having the spectral profile of water, and emits radiation having the spectral profile of platinum. (The platinum also picks up heat from collisions with moving gas molecules).

The term calorescence is rarely seen in use today, whereas the term fluorescence is common. One reason is that there isn't a physical explanation for calorescence that's specific to calorescence. Relatedly, the physical explanations for some types of fluorescence behavior are also explanations for calorescence and the word fluorescence has been preferred and expanded in customary usage to include calorescence. Another reason is that there isn't a widely used practical application attached to the word calorescence, whereas there is for fluorescence. A related item of physics terminology today is the so-called "Anti-Stokes Shift". A Stokes shift refers to molecular absorptions of radiant energy of higher frequencies followed by emissions of lower frequencies; and an anti-Stokes shift refers to absorptions of lower frequencies followed by emissions of higher frequencies. With this terminology, practical applications are attached to the term "anti-Stokes photoluminescence" in materials science including semiconductors (see examples). Equal terminology in use in laser science is "infrared upconversion", "upconversion luminescence", or simply "upconversion" (see examples). This terminology is usually contemplating luminescence, as opposed to incandescence, whereas the word Calorescence belongs to the 19th century when the only known upconversion methods were of the incandescent kind.

== References and external links ==
- Cotter, Joseph Rogerson (1911). "Calorescence" . In Chisholm, Hugh (ed.). Encyclopædia Britannica. Vol. 5 (11th ed.). Cambridge University Press. p. 80. This contains a detailed description of the concept and experimental demonstrations in similar terms to the current article.
- John Tyndall's two laboratory demonstrations described above appear in Tyndall's 1872 book Contributions to Molecular Physics in the Domain of Radiant Heat (format DjVu, 17 megabytes).
