= Tristram Ellis =

English painter

- Born: 2 July 1844; Great Malvern, Worcestershire, England
- Died: 25 July 1922 (aged 78); Barnes, London, England
- Education: Queenwood College, Hampshire; King's College, London
- Known for: Painting, sketching, illustration
- Movement: Orientalist
- Father: Alexander John Ellis

Tristram James Ellis (2 July 1844 – 25 July 1922) was an English artist who was known for his paintings of the Middle East and eastern Mediterranean.

== Early life ==
Ellis was the son of the mathematician and philologist Alexander John Ellis. He and his twin sister, Miriam Anne, were born at Great Malvern on 2 July 1844. He was known to his family as Tristie and spent his early years in Bath, Clifton and Edinburgh, after which he was sent to school at Queenwood College in Hampshire. At school, he excelled in mathematics, and while he did study drawing, he disliked the emphasis placed on copying rather than original art. In 1862, Ellis went to King's College, London, where during his second year he earned the highest distinction in the Applied Sciences department in the college's history. He won all the scholarships offered by the college and was awarded the Associateship of King's College after only two years' study, in recognition of his exceptional achievements.

After university, Ellis completed a pupilage under the railway engineer Sir John Fowler and became a partner in a firm of engineers. After several years, Ellis decided that his calling lay in art. As he had sufficient means to support himself, he abandoned engineering and devoted his time to oil painting.

== Artistic career ==
Several of Ellis's early oil paintings were shown at the Royal Academy. Despite this, he felt his technique needed improvement and moved to Paris to become a student of Léon Bonnat, practicing 12 hours a day. Ellis was one of 170 students from 43 countries in Bonnat's studio at the time, but seems to have developed a friendship with his teacher, who advised him to focus on history painting. Ellis, however, was too interested in the outdoors to accept Bonnat's suggestion.

After his studies in Paris, Ellis began to travel to sketch foreign scenes. In 1878, he spent six months in Cyprus, then under British occupation, where he contracted a fever. Despite this he returned with 50–60 watercolor sketches that were all sold to a dealer after their exhibition in Bond Street in April 1879. This success encouraged him to plan a more ambitious trip, and so on 1 October 1879 he boarded a steamship for Alexandria with the aim of visiting Syria, Asia Minor and Mesopotamia. Ellis succeeded in traveling from the Syrian coast, overland to Diyarbakır in southeast Turkey and then by raft down the Tigris to Mosul and Baghdad in Iraq. From Baghdad, Ellis traveled overland to Palmyra and Damascus in Syria and then to Beirut, Lebanon. After his return, he showed about 90 sketches from his travels, and sold them immediately. Ellis also wrote a two-volume illustrated account of his trip, "On a Raft, and Through the Desert", which was published in 1881.

Ellis's next trip was to Egypt in the spring of 1882. He spent three weeks at the Pyramids, where he stayed with the Egyptologist Flinders Petrie, and left the country in May, just before the massacre at Alexandria on 11 June 1882 that precipitated the Anglo-Egyptian War. Several years later, Ellis made another trip to the eastern Mediterranean, where he spent time in Athens, and had three sketches selected by George I of Greece. After this, Ellis made three visits to the Arctic, including to Spitzbergen, and also returned to the Mediterranean. In 1896, Ellis was married and living comfortably in London.

== Works ==
This is a partial list of works by Tristram Ellis.

=== Books and articles ===
- Ellis, Tristram J. (1879), Twelve etchings of the principal views and places of interest in Cyprus: with a descriptive account of each plate., OCLC 79100467
- Ellis, Tristram James (1881), On a Raft, and Through the Desert, vol. I: On a Raft, Field and Tuer
- Ellis, Tristram James (1881), On a Raft, and Through the Desert, vol. II: Through the Desert, Field and Tuer
- Ellis, Tristram J. (1883), Sketching from Nature: A Handbook for Students and Amateurs, London: Macmillan
- Ellis, Tristram (October 1889), "Hierapolis and Its White Terrace", Harper's Magazine, vol. 79, no. 473, pp. 687–693

== Gallery ==
Works by Tristram James Ellis
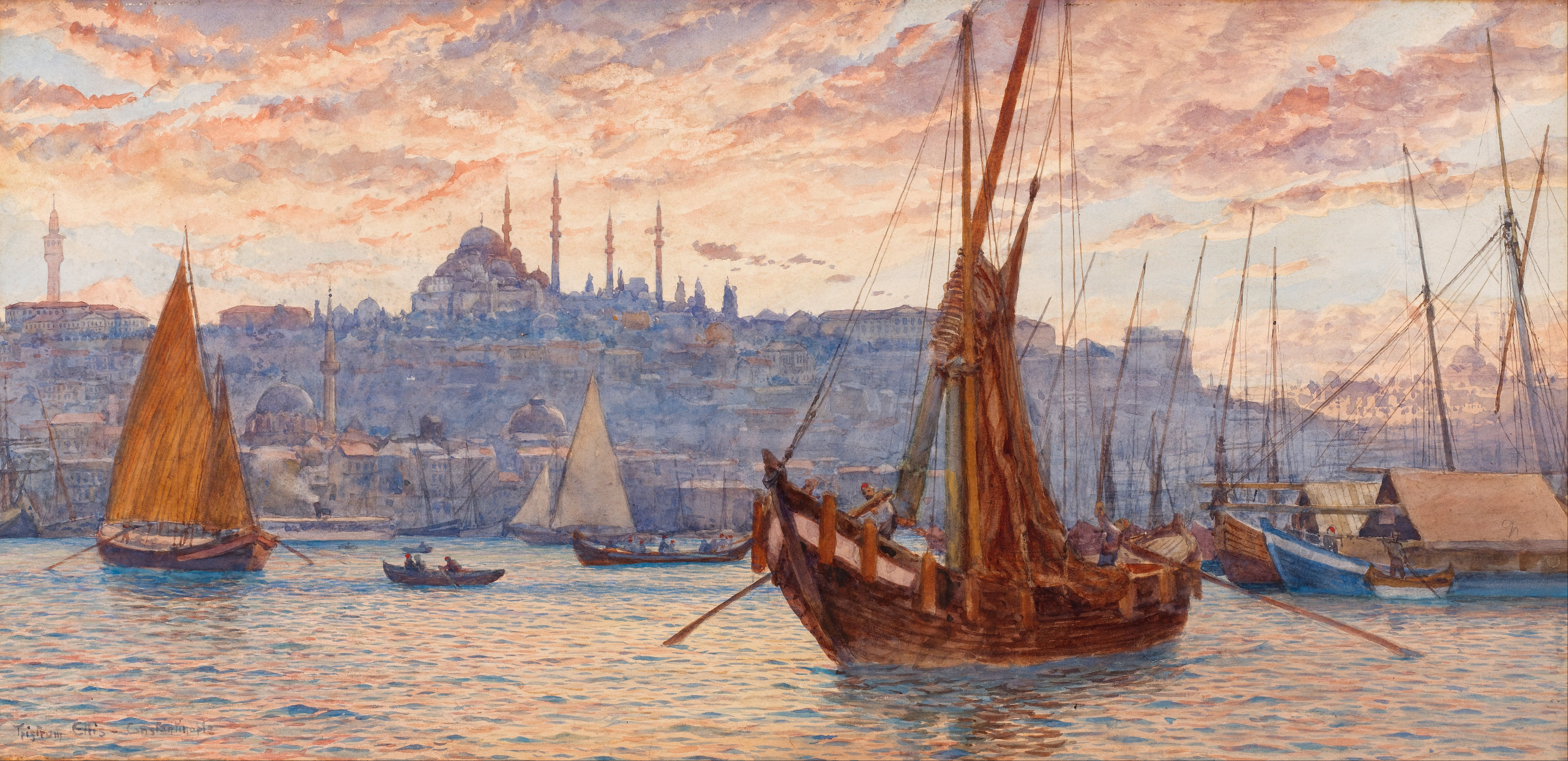
The Golden Horn

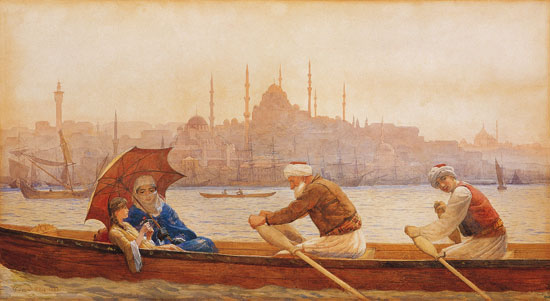
Excursion on the Golden Horn

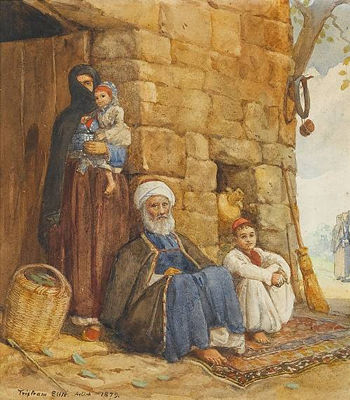
A Druse family of the Lebanon

== Sources ==
- "Births of Sons". London Observer. 7 July 1844. p.4, col.6. "2d. at Great Malvern, Mrs. Alexander John Ellis, of Cotmandene Lodge, Dorking, Surrey, daughter of the late John Clervaux Chaytor, Esq., of Spennithorne Hall, Yorkshire (a son and a daughter)"
- Black, Helen C. (1896), Pen, pencil, baton and mask: biographical sketches, Spottiswoode
- MacMahon, M. K. C. (23 September 2004). "Ellis [formerly Sharpe], Alexander John". Oxford Dictionary of National Biography (online ed.). Oxford University Press. doi:10.1093/ref:odnb/8683. (Subscription, Wikipedia Library access or UK public library membership required.)
- "Ellis, Tristram", Who's Who, p. 768, 1919
