= Tyndall's bar breaker =

Demonstration of thermal expansion

1) Setup experiment with connecting rod (b) placed in frame (d) held by bar (c) and fastened by nut (a). 2) Heating phase with compensation of length extension by fastening nut (a). 3) Cooling phase with deformation or breaking of bar (c).

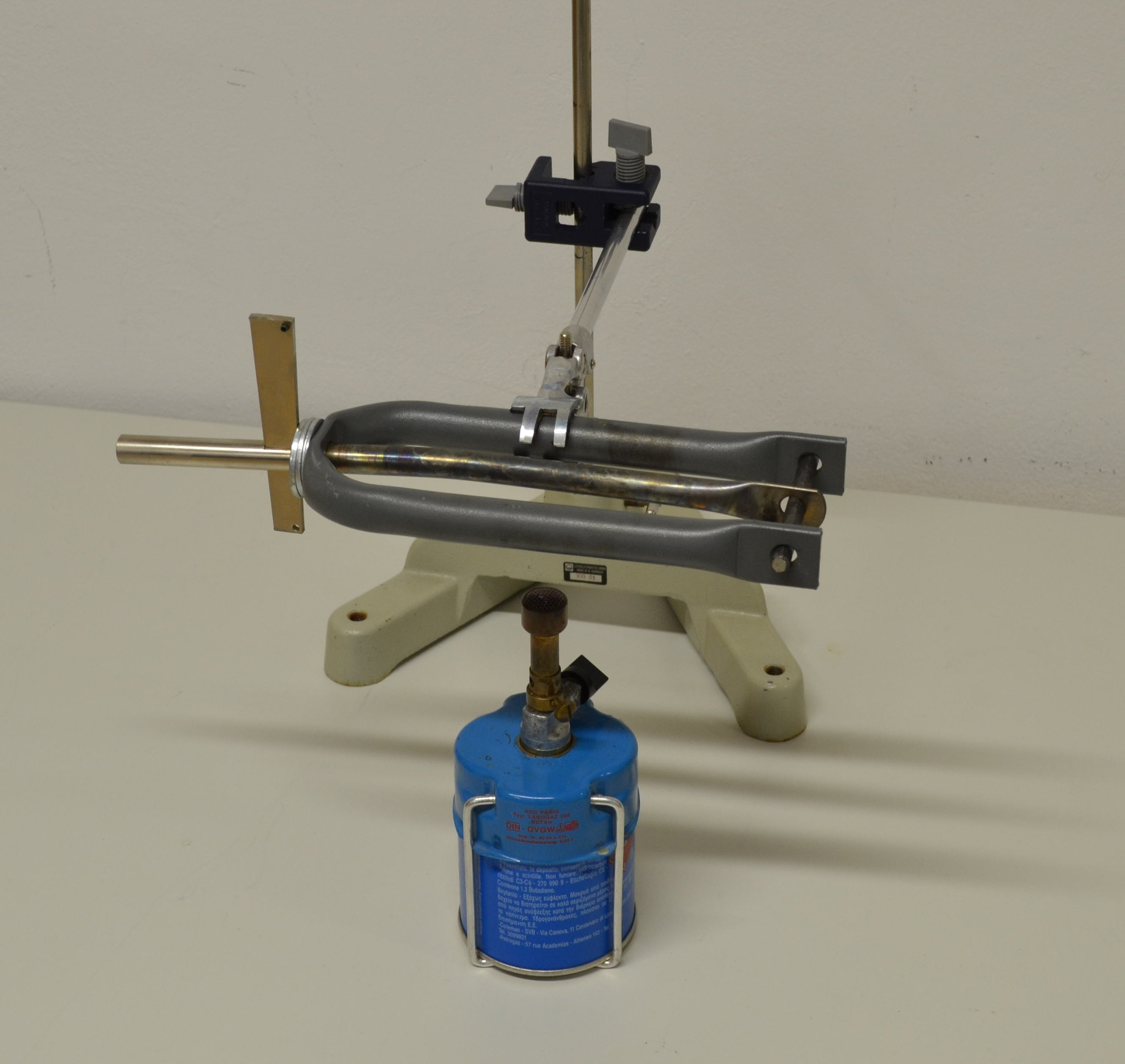
Realisation of Tyndall's bar breaker experiment ready to start.

Tyndall's bar breaker is a physical demonstration experiment to demonstrate the forces created by thermal expansion and shrinkage. It was demonstrated 1867 by the Irish scientist John Tyndall in his Christmas lectures for a "juvenile auditory".

== Setup ==
The bar breaker experiment comprises a very rigid frame (d) and a massive connecting rod (b). The rod is held on one side by a cast iron bar (c) that is going to be broken in the experiment and, at the other end, by a nut (a) that is used to compensate the thermal expansion.

== Procedure ==
During the experiment the steel rod (b) is heated with a flame (e) up to red heat temperature. During the heating phase the thermal expansion of the rod (b) is compensated by tightly fastening the nut (a). Taking away the flame starts the cooling phase. Typically the bar (c) breaks within a few minutes with a loud bang or it is at least deformed significantly.

Performing Tyndall's bar breaker experiment

== Media ==
- Media related to Tyndall's bar breaker at Wikimedia Commons
