= Walter Flight =

- Born: 21 January 1841; Winchester, England, United Kingdom
- Died: 4 November 1885 (aged 44)
- Citizenship: Great Britain
- Education: Queenwood College (Hampshire); University of London
- Scientific career
- Fields: chemistry, mineralogy

Walter Flight (21 January 1841 – 4 November 1885), was an English mineralogist who studied the chemical composition of meteorites. He published academic papers on the chemical composition of meteorites in both Germany and the United Kingdom. He also worked for the British Museum, the Royal Military Academy, Woolwich, and on a committee appointed by the British Science Association, then known as the British Association.

== Early life ==
Walter Flight was the son of William P. Flight of Winchester, and was born in Winchester on 21 January 1841. He was educated at Queenwood College in Hampshire, where he was taught chemistry by Professor Debus and physics from Professor Tyndall, and in after life Debus was his constant friend. After coming of age Flight proceeded to Germany and spent the winter session of 1863-1864 studying chemistry under Professor Heintz at the University of Halle. He passed the next two years at Heidelberg, and acquired a thorough knowledge of chemistry. His studies in Germany were completed at Berlin, where he acted for some time as secretary and chemical assistant to Professor Hofmann.

== Career ==
In 1867 Flight returned to England, and took the degree of doctor of science at the University of London. In 1868 he was appointed assistant examiner there in chemistry under Professor Debus. On 5 September 1867 he became an assistant in the mineralogical department of the British Museum under Professor Nevil Story-Maskelyne. In the laboratory, which was now specially fitted up, he commenced a series of researches upon the mineral constituents of meteorites and their occluded gases, which rapidly brought him into notice.

He was appointed examiner in chemistry and physics at the Royal Military Academy, Woolwich, in 1868, and in 1876 examiner to the Royal Military Academy, Cheltenham. He also acted for several years as a member of the committee on luminous meteors appointed by the British Association.

== Publications ==
Flight wrote twenty-one papers on scientific subjects, of which the first three, all on chemical subjects, appeared in German periodicals in 1864-5-70. The later papers were chiefly upon meteorites, dealing in detail with the recorded circumstances of their fall, and with their mineralogical and chemical constituents; several, written in conjunction with Professor Story-Maskelyne, give accounts, published in the Philosophical Transactions, of the meteorites which fell at Rowton in Shropshire, at Middlesbrough, England, and at Cranbourne, Australia.

A paper, thus jointly written, on Francolite, Vivianite, and Cronstedtite from Cornwall, appeared in the Journal of the Chemical Society for 1871. The last paper Flight wrote was on the meteorite of Alfianello in Italy. Between 1875 and 1883 Flight contributed a series of twenty-three papers to the Geological Magazine, entitled A Chapter in the History of Meteorites (published in book form in 1887).

== Later life ==
Flight was elected a fellow of the Royal Society on 7 June 1883.

In 1884 he was taken so seriously ill that he was compelled to resign his post in the British Museum, and died on 4 November 1885, leaving a widow and three young children. He had married Kate, the daughter of Dr Fell of Ambleside.
