= George Edmondson (educationalist) =

English educationalist (1798–1863)

George Edmondson (1798–1863) was an English educationalist.

== Biography ==
=== Early life ===
Edmondson was born in Lancaster, Lancashire, on 8 September 1798, to Quaker parents John and Jane. His family were members of the Society of Friends. It is said that he shared a gift for mechanical invention with his brother Thomas. They were both educated at Ackworth School, Yorkshire, of which John Fothergill was the principal supporter. At 14, Edmondson left school. He wanted to be a teacher, and was apprenticed to William Singleton, the reading master of Ackworth School, who had set up a boarding-school in a large house at Broomhall, near Sheffield. There Edmondson learned bookbinding, and Daniel Wheeler taught him agriculture.

=== Time in Russia ===
In 1814 Alexander I of Russia visited England. Impressed by the Quakers, he invited Daniel Wheeler in 1817 to superintend some agricultural institutions in Russia. Edmondson, on the suggestion of Singleton, joined the party as the tutor to Wheeler's children and assistant in the work. He lived in Russia until 1820, when he returned to England to marry Anne Singleton, daughter of the schoolmaster. He returned with his wife to Okhta, near St. Petersburg, where they were living during the flooding in 1824. In the course of the following year, the whole of the bog land around the capital was brought into cultivation.

=== Return to England ===
After seven years' residence in Russia, Edmondson returned to England, although the emperor made him handsome offers to remain. The tsar offered Edmondson a thousand acres of unreclaimed land at Shushary, which Edmondson declined. In England, Edmondson opened a school at Blackburn in 1830, and later one at Tulketh Hall, near Preston.

=== Queenwood College ===
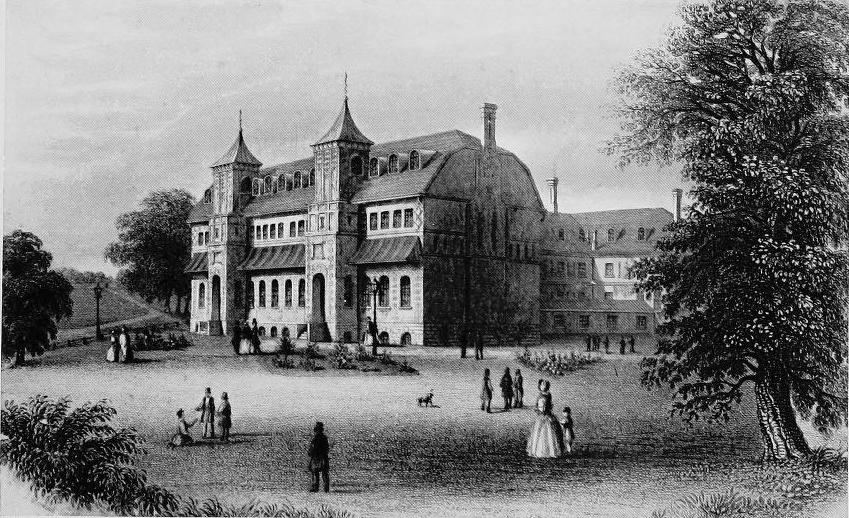
Queenwood College was founded in 1847 by George Edmondson. The site was destroyed in a 1902 fire.

Successful at Tulketh, he was asked to take on Queenwood Hall near Stockbridge, Hampshire, erected by the followers of Robert Owen, with 800 acres of land. A science laboratory was built. There was a printing-office, in which a monthly periodical was issued, edited, at one time set up by the students he taught. He had several Bradshaws among his school books, in which the students were examined in finding routes. Edmondson was one of the early promoters of the College of Preceptors, and vocational training, with a carpenter's and a blacksmith's shop. Edmondson employed John Tyndall, Thomas Archer Hirst, Heinrich Debus, and Edward Frankland as teachers at Queenwood College. One of the first pupils at Queenwood was Henry Fawcett.

=== Death ===
Edmondson died, after one day's illness, on 15 May 1863, and was buried in the burial-ground of the Society of Friends at Southampton.
