= Arthur Ernest Sansom =

British physician and anaesthesiologist

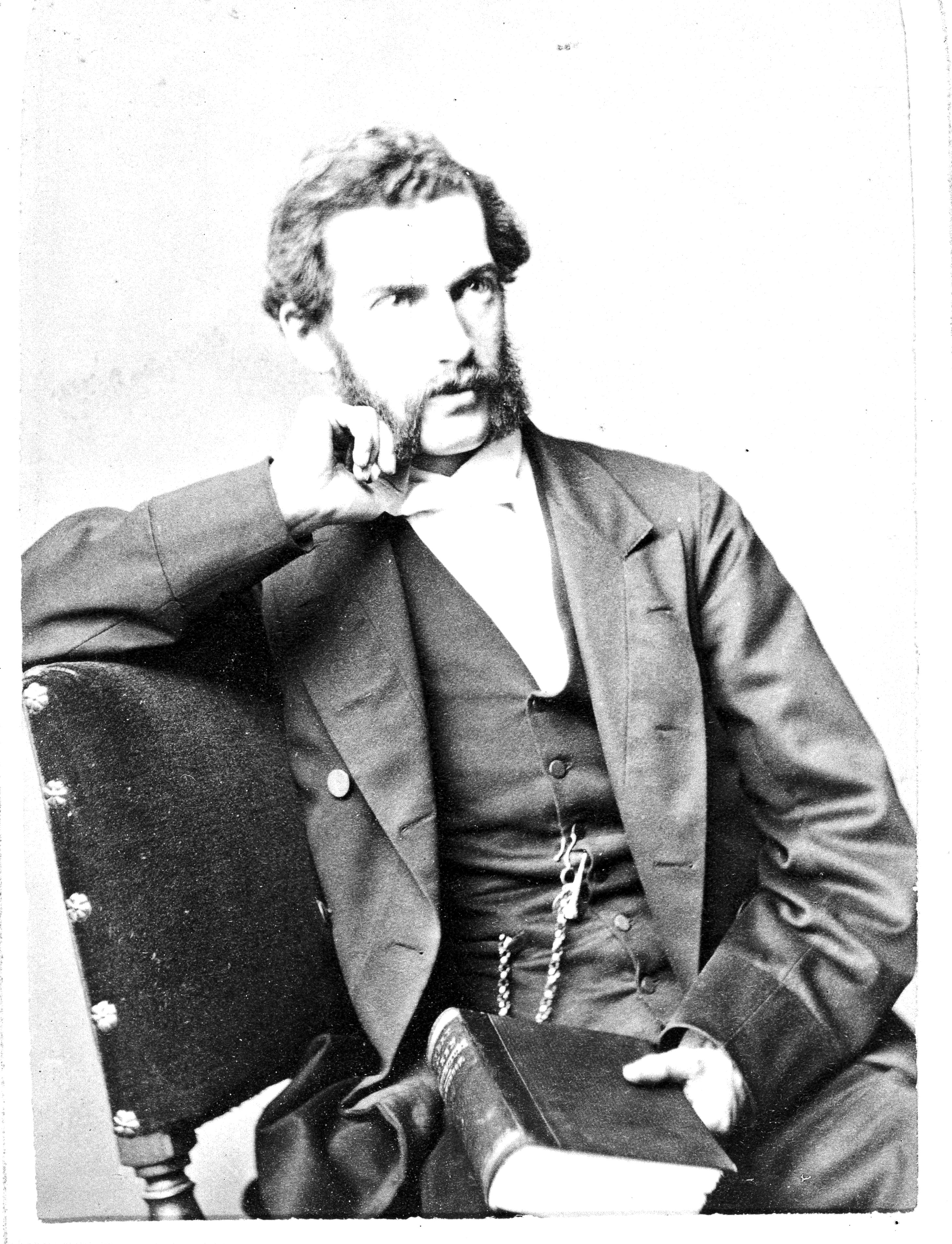
Arthur Sansom

Arthur Ernest Sansom FRCP (13 May 1838 in Corsham – 10 March 1907 in Bournemouth) was an English physician, known for his pioneering research on anaesthesiology, the use of carbolic acid in medicine, and diagnosis of heart disease.

== Biography ==
Sansom was educated at Queenwood College near Stockbridge, Hampshire and then at King's College, London. He wrote one of the first and most practical handbooks on anaesthetics and read a paper Anaesthetics in Obstetric Practice before the Obstetrical Society. He tried carbon tetrachloride as an inhalational anaesthetic on animals in 1864 and later as obstetrical anaesthesia on humans in 1865. Sansom suggested an anaesthetic mixture of 1 part carbon tetrachloride and 6 parts chloroform next year in British Medical Journal.

In 1869–1870 Sansom emphasized the importance of Pasteur's research, together with some research of his own, in a series a papers he presented to the Medical Society of London. He was consulting physician to the London Hospital and to the North-Eastern Hospital for Children. Sansom was elected a Fellow of the Royal College of Physicians in 1878. He was President of the Medical Society of London for the year 1897.

In a number of his published Obituaries in 1907, the final sentence states that - ‘He was survived by his wife and six children’. This was incorrect, as at his death seven legitimate children survived him. He was buried was at East Finchley Cemetery.

== Books ==
- Sansom, Arthur Ernest (1865). Chloroform: its action and administration. A handbook.
- Arrest and prevention of cholera. 1866.
- On the pain of parturition, and anæsthetics in obstetric practice. 1869.
- Sansom, Arthur Ernest (1871). The antiseptic system.
- The physical diagnosis of diseases of the heart and thoracic aorta. 1876.
