= Tyndallization =

Sterilization method

Tyndallization is a process from the nineteenth century for sterilizing substances, usually food, named after its inventor John Tyndall, that can be used to kill heat-resistant endospores. Although now considered dated, it is still occasionally used.

A simple and effective sterilizing method commonly used today is autoclaving: heating the substance being sterilized to 121 °C (250 °F) for 15 minutes in a pressured system. If autoclaving is not possible because of lack of equipment, or the need to sterilize something that will not withstand the higher temperature, unpressurized heating for a prolonged period at a temperature of up to 100 °C (212 °F), the boiling point of water, may be used. The heat will kill any bacterial cells; however, bacterial spores capable of later germinating into bacterial cells may survive. Tyndallization can be used to destroy the spores.

Tyndallization essentially consists of heating the substance to boiling point (or just a little below boiling point) and holding it there for 15 minutes, three days in succession. After each heating, the resting period will allow spores that have survived to germinate into bacterial cells; these cells will be killed by the next day's heating. During the resting periods the substance being sterilized is kept in a moist environment at a warm room temperature, conducive to germination of the spores. When the environment is favourable for bacteria, it is conducive to the germination of cells from spores, and spores do not form from cells in this environment (see bacterial spores).

The Tyndallization process is usually effective in practice, but it is not considered completely reliable: some spores may survive and later germinate and multiply. It is not often used today, but is used for sterilizing items that cannot withstand pressurized heating, such as plant seeds.

== See also ==
- Pasteurization
- Thermization
