= John Tyndall =

Irish physicist (1820–1893)

John Tyndall FRS
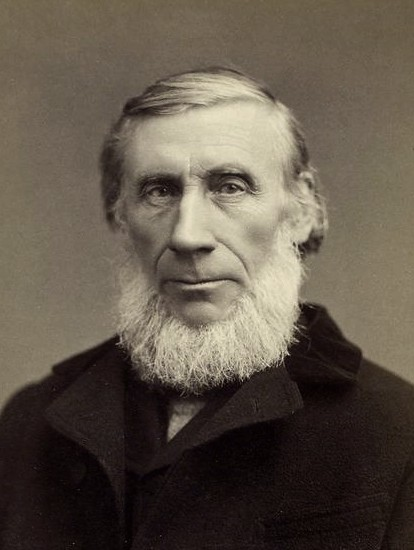
- Born: 2 August 1820; Leighlinbridge, County Carlow, Ireland
- Died: 4 December 1893 (aged 73); Haslemere, Surrey, England
- Education: University of Marburg
- Known for: Researching the greenhouse effect (1859); Coining the term calorescence (1864); Inventing capnography (1864); Tyndall's bar breaker (1867); Tyndall effect (1869); Discovering thermophoresis (1870); Improving the respirator (1871)
- Spouse: Louisa Charlotte Hamilton (m. 1876)
- Awards: FRS (1852); Royal Medal (1853); Bakerian Medal (1855, 1861, 1864, 1881); Rumford Medal (1864)
- Scientific career
- Fields: Physics
- Workplaces: Royal Institution (1853–1887)
- Academic advisors: Robert Bunsen; Hermann Knoblauch
- Notable students: Mihajlo Pupin

Signature
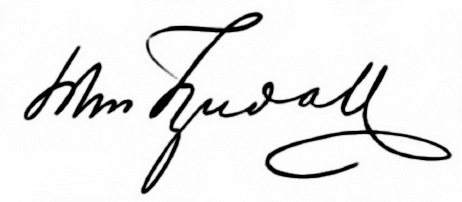

John Tyndall (/ˈtɪndəl/; 2 August 1820 – 4 December 1893) was an Irish physicist. His scientific fame arose in the 1850s from his study of diamagnetism. Later he made discoveries in the realms of infrared radiation and the physical properties of air, proving the connection between atmospheric CO_{2} and what is now known as the greenhouse effect in 1859.

Tyndall also published more than a dozen science books which brought state-of-the-art 19th century experimental physics to a wide audience. From 1853 to 1887 he was professor of physics at the Royal Institution of Great Britain in London. He was elected as a member to the American Philosophical Society in 1868.

== Early years and education ==
Tyndall was born in Leighlinbridge, County Carlow, Ireland. His father was a local police constable, descended from Gloucestershire emigrants who settled in southeast Ireland around 1670. Tyndall attended the local schools (Ballinabranna Primary School) in County Carlow until his late teens, and was probably an assistant teacher near the end of his time there. Subjects learned at school notably included technical drawing and mathematics with some applications of those subjects to land surveying. He was hired as a draftsman by the Ordnance Survey of Ireland in his late teens in 1839, and moved to work for the Ordnance Survey for Great Britain in 1842. In the decade of the 1840s, a railway-building boom was in progress, and Tyndall's land surveying experience was valuable and in demand by the railway companies. Between 1844 and 1847, he was lucratively employed in railway construction planning.

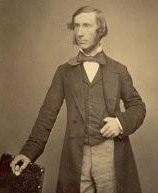
John Tyndall circa 1850

In 1847, Tyndall opted to become a mathematics and surveying teacher at Queenwood College, a boarding school in Hampshire. Recalling this decision later, he wrote: "the desire to grow intellectually did not forsake me; and, when railway work slackened, I accepted in 1847 a post as master in Queenwood College." Another recently arrived young teacher at Queenwood was Edward Frankland, who had previously worked as a chemical laboratory assistant for the British Geological Survey. Frankland and Tyndall became good friends. On the strength of Frankland's prior knowledge, they decided to go to Germany to further their education in science. Among other things, Frankland knew that while British universities were still focused on classics and mathematics and not laboratory science, certain German universities were ahead of any in Britain in experimental chemistry and physics. The pair moved to Germany in summer 1848 and enrolled at the University of Marburg, attracted by the reputation of Robert Bunsen as a teacher. Tyndall studied under Bunsen for two years. Perhaps more influential for Tyndall at Marburg was Professor Hermann Knoblauch, with whom Tyndall maintained communications by letter for many years afterwards. Tyndall's Marburg dissertation was a mathematical analysis of screw surfaces in 1850 (under Friedrich Ludwig Stegmann). Tyndall stayed in Germany for a further year doing research on magnetism with Knoblauch, including some months' visit at the Berlin laboratory of Knoblauch's main teacher, Heinrich Gustav Magnus. It is clear today that Bunsen and Magnus were among the very best experimental science instructors of the era. Thus, when Tyndall returned to live in England in summer 1851, he probably had as good an education in experimental science as anyone in England.

== Early scientific work ==
Tyndall's early original work in physics was his experiments on magnetism and diamagnetic polarity, on which he worked from 1850 to 1856. His two most influential reports were the first two, co-authored with Knoblauch. One of them was entitled "The magneto-optic properties of crystals, and the relation of magnetism and diamagnetism to molecular arrangement", dated May 1850. The two described an inspired experiment, with an inspired interpretation. These and other magnetic investigations very soon made Tyndall known among the leading scientists of the day. He was elected a Fellow of the Royal Society in 1852. In his search for a suitable research appointment, he was able to ask the longtime editor of the leading German physics journal (Poggendorff) and other prominent men to write testimonials on his behalf. In 1853, he attained the prestigious appointment of Professor of Natural Philosophy (Physics) at the Royal Institution in London, due in no small part to the esteem his work had garnered from Michael Faraday, the leader of magnetic investigations at the Royal Institution. About a decade later Tyndall was appointed the successor to the positions held by Michael Faraday at the Royal Institution on Faraday's retirement.

== Alpine mountaineering and glaciology ==
Tyndall visited the Alps mountains in 1856 for scientific reasons and ended up becoming a pioneering mountain climber. He visited the Alps almost every summer from 1856 onward, was a member of the very first mountain-climbing team to reach the top of the Weisshorn (1861), and led one of the early teams to reach the top of the Matterhorn (1868). His is one of the names associated with the "Golden age of alpinism" — the mid-Victorian years when the more difficult of the Alpine peaks were summited for the first time.

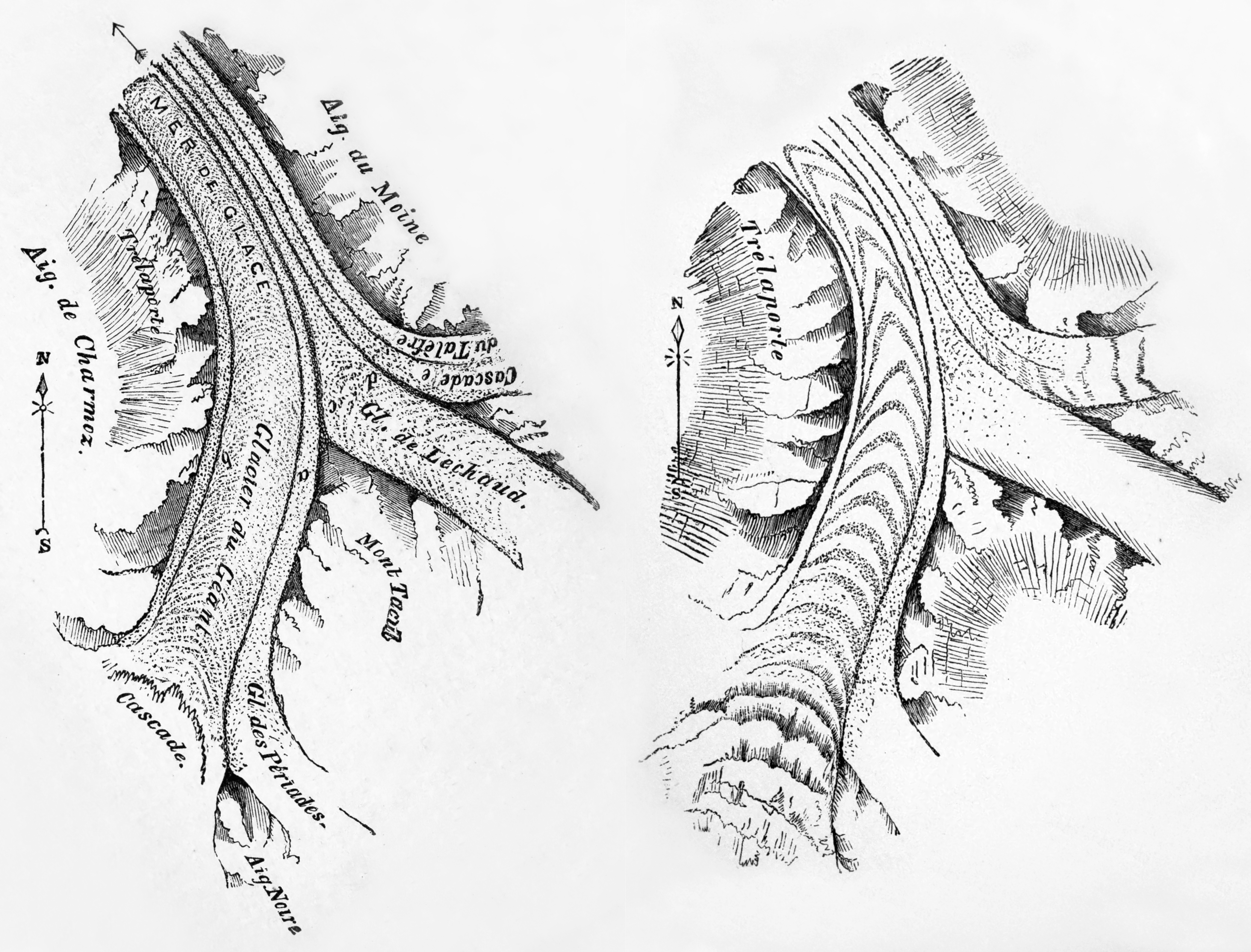
John Tyndall explored the glacial tributaries feeding Mer de Glace in 1857. General topology (left); dirt-bands in glacier (right).

In the Alps, Tyndall studied glaciers, and especially glacier motion. His explanation of glacial flow brought him into dispute with others, particularly James David Forbes. Much of the early scientific work on glacier motion had been done by Forbes, but Forbes at that time did not know of the phenomenon of regelation, which was discovered a little later by Michael Faraday. Regelation played a key role in Tyndall's explanation. Forbes did not see regelation in the same way at all. Complicating their debate, a disagreement arose publicly over who deserved to get investigator credit for what. Articulate friends of Forbes, as well as Forbes himself, thought that Forbes should get the credit for most of the good science, whereas Tyndall thought the credit should be distributed more widely. Tyndall commented: "The idea of semi-fluid motion belongs entirely to Louis Rendu; the proof of the quicker central flow belongs in part to Rendu, but almost wholly to Louis Agassiz and Forbes; the proof of the retardation of the bed belongs to Forbes alone; while the discovery of the locus of the point of maximum motion belongs, I suppose, to me." When Forbes and Tyndall were in the grave, their disagreement was continued by their respective official biographers. Everyone tried to be reasonable, but agreement was not attained. More disappointingly, aspects of glacier motion remained not understood or not proved.

Numerous landforms and geographical features are named for John Tyndall, including Tyndall Glacier in Chile, Tyndall Glacier in Colorado, Tyndall Glacier in Alaska, Mount Tyndall in California, and Mount Tyndall in Tasmania.

== Main scientific work ==
Work on glaciers alerted Tyndall to the research of Horace Bénédict de Saussure into the heating effect of sunlight, and the concept of Joseph Fourier, developed by Claude Pouillet and William Hopkins, that heat from the sun penetrates the atmosphere more easily than "obscure heat" (infrared) "terrestrial radiation" from the warmed Earth, causing what is now known as the greenhouse effect. In the spring of 1859, Tyndall began research into how thermal radiation, both visible and obscure, affects different gases and aerosols. He developed differential absorption spectroscopy using the electro-magnetic thermopile devised by Macedonio Melloni. Tyndall began intensive experiments on 9 May 1859, at first without significant results, then improved the sensitivity of the apparatus and on 18 May wrote in his journal "Experimented all day; the subject is completely in my hands!" On 26 May he gave the Royal Society a note which described his methods, and stated "With the exception of the celebrated memoir of M. Pouillet on Solar Radiation through the atmosphere, nothing, so far as I am aware, has been published on the transmission of radiant heat through gaseous bodies. We know nothing of the effect even of air upon heat radiated from terrestrial sources."

On 10 June, he demonstrated the research in a Royal Institution discourse, noting that coal gas and ether strongly absorbed (infrared) radiant heat, and his experimental confirmation of the concept; that solar heat crosses an atmosphere, but "when the heat is absorbed by the planet, it is so changed in quality that the rays emanating from the planet cannot get with the same freedom back into space. Thus the atmosphere admits of the entrance of solar heat; but checks its exit, and the result is a tendency to accumulate heat at the surface of the planet."

Tyndall's studies of the action of radiant energy on the constituents of air led him onto several lines of inquiry, and his original research results included the following:

Tyndall's sensitive ratio spectrophotometer (drawing published in 1861) measured the extent to which infrared radiation was absorbed and emitted by various gases filling its central tube.

- Tyndall explained the heat in the Earth's atmosphere in terms of the capacities of the various gases in the air to absorb radiant heat, in the form of infrared radiation. His measuring device, which used thermopile technology, is an early landmark in the history of absorption spectroscopy of gases. He was the first to correctly measure the relative infrared absorptive powers of the gases nitrogen, oxygen, water vapour, carbon dioxide, ozone, methane, and other trace gases and vapours. He concluded that water vapour is the strongest absorber of radiant heat in the atmosphere and is the principal gas controlling air temperature. Absorption by the other gases is not negligible but relatively small. Prior to Tyndall it was widely surmised that the Earth's atmosphere warms the surface in what was later called a greenhouse effect, but he was the first to prove it. The proof was that water vapour strongly absorbed infrared radiation. Three years earlier, in 1856, the American scientist Eunice Newton Foote had announced experiments demonstrating that water vapour and carbon dioxide absorb heat from solar radiation, but she did not differentiate the effects of infrared. Relatedly, Tyndall in 1860 was first to demonstrate and quantify that visually transparent gases are infrared emitters.
- He devised demonstrations that advanced the question of how radiant heat is absorbed and emitted at the molecular level. He appears to be the first person to have demonstrated experimentally that emission of heat in chemical reactions has its physical origination within the newly created molecules (1864). He produced instructive demonstrations involving the incandescent conversion of infrared into visible light at the molecular level, which he called calorescence (1865), in which he used materials that are transparent to infrared and opaque to visible light or vice versa. He usually referred to infrared as "radiant heat", and sometimes as "ultra-red undulations", as the word "infrared" did not start coming into use until the 1880s. His main reports of the 1860s were republished as a 450-page collection in 1872 under the title Contributions to Molecular Physics in the Domain of Radiant Heat.
- In the investigations on radiant heat in air it had been necessary to use air from which all traces of floating dust and other particulates had been removed. A very sensitive way to detect particulates is to bathe the air with intense light. The scattering of light by particulate impurities in air and other gases, and in liquids, is known today as the Tyndall effect or Tyndall scattering. In studying this scattering during the late 1860s Tyndall was a beneficiary of recent improvements in electric-powered lights. He also had the use of good light concentrators. He developed the nephelometer and similar instruments that show properties of aerosols and colloids through concentrated light beams against a dark background and are based on exploiting the Tyndall effect. (When combined with microscopes, the result is the ultramicroscope, which was developed later by others).
- He was the first to observe and report the phenomenon of thermophoresis in aerosols. He spotted it surrounding hot objects while investigating the Tyndall effect with focused lightbeams in a dark room. He devised a better way to demonstrate it, and then simply reported it (1870), without investigating the physics of it in depth.
- In radiant-heat experiments that called for much laboratory expertise in the early 1860s, he showed for a variety of readily vaporisable liquids that, molecule for molecule, the vapour form and the liquid form have essentially the same power to absorb radiant heat. (In modern experiments using narrow-band spectra, some small differences are found that Tyndall's equipment was unable to get at; see e.g. absorption spectrum of H_{2}O).
- He consolidated and enhanced the results of Paul-Quentin Desains, James D. Forbes, Hermann Knoblauch and others demonstrating that the principal properties of visible light can be reproduced for radiant heat – namely reflection, refraction, diffraction, polarisation, depolarisation, double refraction, and rotation in a magnetic field.
- Using his expertise about radiant heat absorption by gases, he invented a system for measuring the amount of carbon dioxide in a sample of exhaled human breath (1862, 1864). The basics of Tyndall's system is in daily use in hospitals today for monitoring patients under anaesthesia. (See capnometry.)
- When studying the absorption of radiant heat by ozone, he came up with a demonstration that helped confirm or reaffirm that ozone is an oxygen cluster (1862).

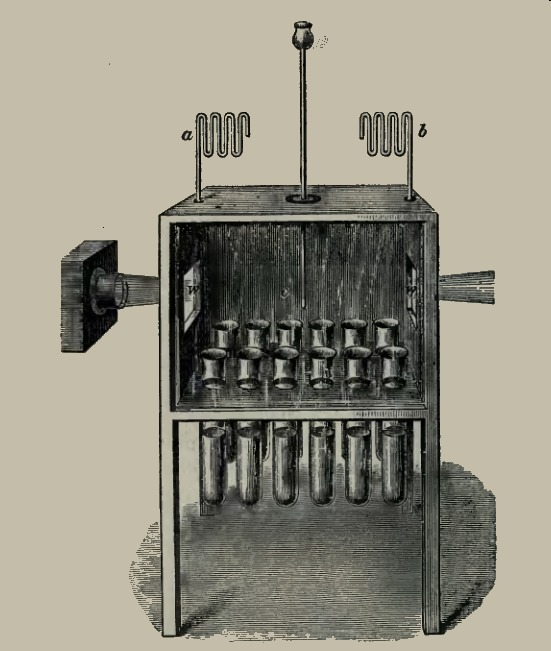
Tyndall's setup for preserving broths in optically pure air.

- In the lab he came up with the following simple way to obtain "optically pure" air, i.e. air that has no visible signs of particulate matter. He built a square wooden box with a couple of glass windows on it. Before closing the box, he coated the inside walls and floor of the box with glycerin, which is a sticky syrup. He found that after a few days' wait the air inside the box was entirely particulate-free when examined with strong light beams through the glass windows. The various floating-matter particulates had all ended up getting stuck to the walls or settling on the sticky floor. Now, in the optically pure air there were no signs of any "germs", i.e. no signs of floating micro-organisms. Tyndall sterilised some meat-broths by simply boiling them, and then compared what happened when he let these meat-broths sit in the optically pure air, and in ordinary air. The broths sitting in the optically pure air remained "sweet" (as he said) to smell and taste after many months of sitting, while the ones in ordinary air started to become putrid after a few days. This demonstration extended Louis Pasteur's earlier demonstrations that the presence of micro-organisms is a precondition for biomass decomposition. However, the next year (1876) Tyndall failed to consistently reproduce the result. Some of his supposedly heat-sterilized broths rotted in the optically pure air. From this Tyndall was led to find viable bacterial spores (endospores) in supposedly heat-sterilized broths. He discovered the broths had been contaminated with dry bacterial spores from hay in the lab. All bacteria are killed by simple boiling, except that bacteria have a spore form that can survive boiling, he correctly contended, citing research by Ferdinand Cohn. Tyndall found a way to eradicate the bacterial spores that came to be known as "Tyndallization". Tyndallization historically was the earliest known effective way to destroy bacterial spores. At the time, it affirmed the "germ theory" against a number of critics whose experimental results had been defective from the same cause. During the mid-1870s Pasteur and Tyndall were in frequent communication.

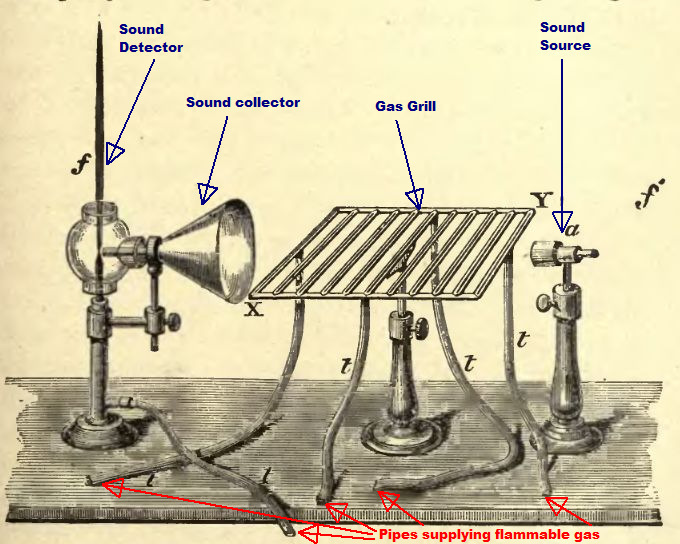
One of Tyndall's setups for showing that sound is reflected in air at the interface between air bodies of different densities.

- Invented a better fireman's respirator, a hood that filtered smoke and noxious gas from air (1871, 1874).
- In the late 1860s and early 1870s he wrote an introductory book about sound propagation in air, and was a participant in a large-scale British project to develop a better foghorn. In laboratory demonstrations motivated by foghorn issues, Tyndall established that sound is partially reflected (i.e. partially bounced back like an echo) at the location where an air mass of one temperature meets another air mass of a different temperature; and more generally when a body of air contains two or more air masses of different densities or temperatures, the sound travels poorly because of reflections occurring at the interfaces between the air masses, and very poorly when many such interfaces are present. (He then argued, though inconclusively, that this is the usual main reason why the same distant sound, e.g. foghorn, can be heard stronger or fainter on different days or at different times of day.)

An index of 19th-century scientific research journals has John Tyndall as the author of more than 147 papers in science research journals, with practically all of them dated between 1850 and 1884, which is an average of more than four papers a year over that 35-year period.

In his lectures at the Royal Institution Tyndall put a great value on, and was talented at producing, lively, visible demonstrations of physics concepts. In one lecture, Tyndall demonstrated the propagation of light down through a stream of falling water via total internal reflection of the light. It was referred to as the "light fountain". It is historically significant today because it demonstrates the scientific foundation for modern fibre optic technology. During second half of the 20th century Tyndall was usually credited with being the first to make this demonstration. However, Jean-Daniel Colladon published a report of it in Comptes Rendus in 1842, and there's some suggestive evidence that Tyndall's knowledge of it came ultimately from Colladon and no evidence that Tyndall claimed to have originated it himself.

=== Molecular physics of radiant heat ===
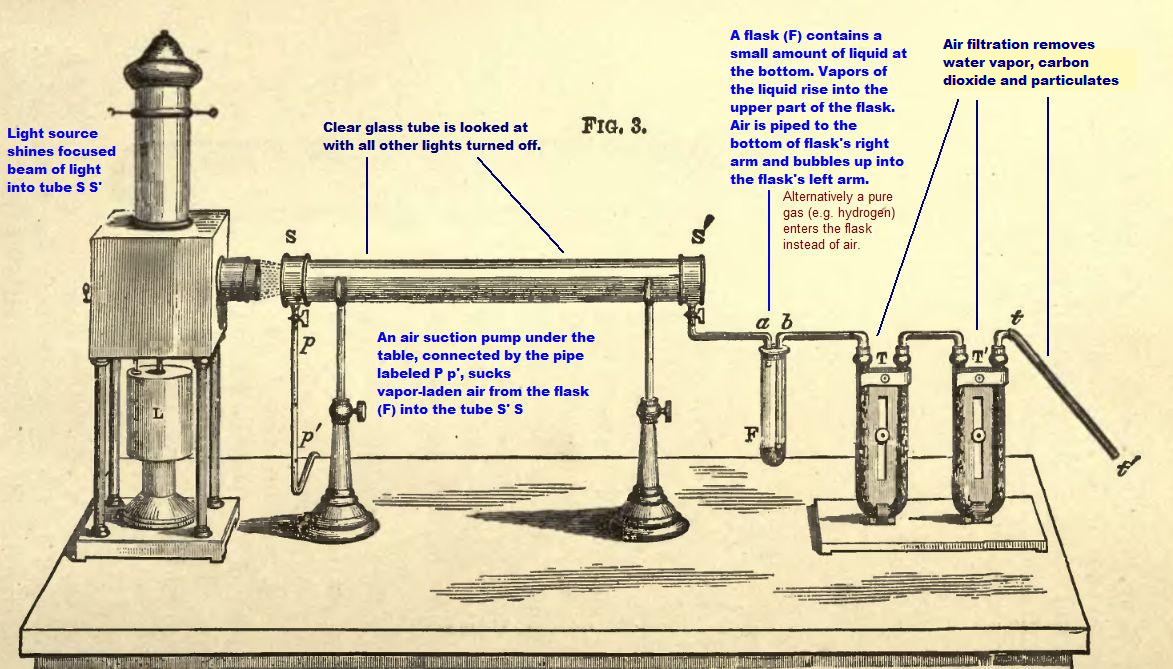
With this setup Tyndall observed new chemical reactions produced by high frequency light waves acting on certain vapours. The main scientific interest here from his point of view was the additional hard data it lent to the grand question of the mechanism by which molecules absorb radiant energy.

Tyndall was an experimenter and laboratory apparatus builder, not an abstract model builder. But in his experiments on radiation and the heat-absorptive power of gases, he had an underlying agenda to understand the physics of molecules. Tyndall said in 1879: "During nine years of labour on the subject of radiation [in the 1860s], heat and light were handled throughout by me, not as ends, but as instruments by the aid of which the mind might perchance lay hold upon the ultimate particles of matter." This agenda is explicit in the title he picked for his 1872 book Contributions to Molecular Physics in the Domain of Radiant Heat. It is present less explicitly in the spirit of his widely read 1863 book Heat Considered as a Mode of Motion. Besides heat he also saw magnetism and sound propagation as reducible to molecular behaviours. Invisible molecular behaviours were the ultimate basis of all physical activity. With this mindset, and his experiments, he outlined an account whereby differing types of molecules have differing absorptions of infrared radiation because their molecular structures give them differing oscillating resonances. He'd gotten into the oscillating resonances idea because he'd seen that any one type of molecule has differing absorptions at differing radiant frequencies, and he was entirely persuaded that the only difference between one frequency and another is the frequency. He'd also seen that the absorption behaviour of molecules is quite different from that of the atoms composing the molecules. For example, the gas nitric oxide (NO) absorbed more than a thousand times more infrared radiation than either nitrogen (N_{2}) or oxygen (O_{2}). He'd also seen in several kinds of experiments that – no matter whether a gas is a weak absorber of broad-spectrum radiant heat – any gas will strongly absorb the radiant heat coming from a separate body of the same type of gas. That demonstrated a kinship between the molecular mechanisms of absorption and emission. Such a kinship was also in evidence in experiments by Balfour Stewart and others, cited and extended by Tyndall, that showed with respect to broad-spectrum radiant heat that molecules that are weak absorbers are weak emitters and strong absorbers are strong emitters. (For example, rock-salt is an exceptionally poor absorber of heat via radiation, and a good absorber of heat via conduction. When a plate of rock-salt is heated via conduction and let stand on an insulator, it takes an exceptionally long time to cool down; i.e., it's a poor emitter of infrared.) The kinship between absorption and emission was also consistent with some generic or abstract features of resonators. The chemical decomposition of molecules by lightwaves (photochemical effect) convinced Tyndall that the resonator could not be the molecule as a whole unit; it had to be some substructure, because otherwise the photochemical effect would be impossible. But he was without testable ideas as to the form of this substructure, and did not partake in speculation in print. His promotion of the molecular mindset, and his efforts to experimentally expose what molecules are, has been discussed by one historian under the title "John Tyndall, The Rhetorician of Molecularity".

== Educator ==
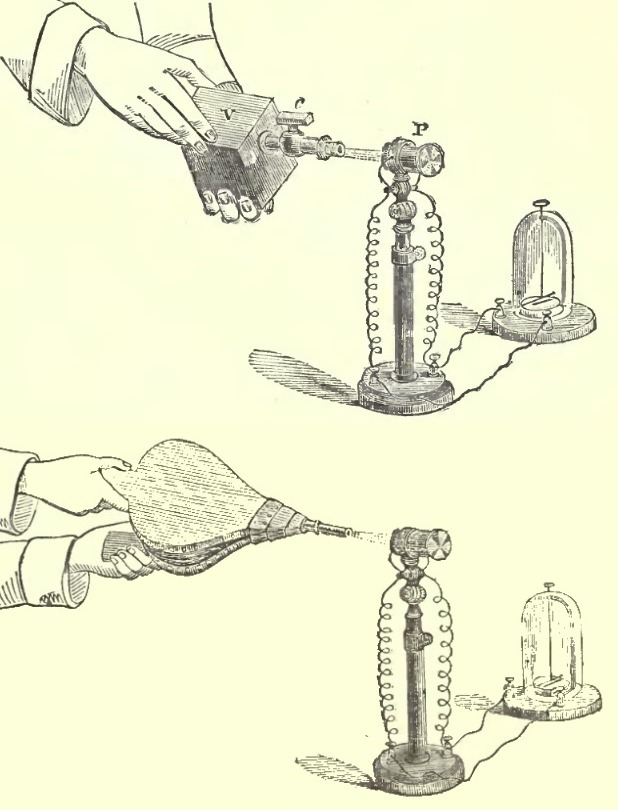
John Tyndall's tutorial books about physics contained many illustrations. This one, from Heat Considered as Mode of Motion, is his setup for demonstrating that air cools during the act of expanding in volume; and that air heats up during the act of compressing in volume. (Click on image for more explanation).

Besides being a scientist, John Tyndall was a science teacher and evangelist for the cause of science. He spent a significant amount of his time disseminating science to the general public. He gave hundreds of public lectures to non-specialist audiences at the Royal Institution in London. When he went on a public lecture tour in the US in 1872, large crowds of non-scientists paid fees to hear him lecture about the nature of light. A typical statement of Tyndall's reputation at the time is this from a London publication in 1878: "Following the precedent set by Faraday, Professor Tyndall has succeeded not only in original investigation and in teaching science soundly and accurately, but in making it attractive.... When he lectures at the Royal Institution the theatre is crowded." Tyndall said of the occupation of teacher "I do not know a higher, nobler, and more blessed calling." His greatest audience was gained ultimately through his books, most of which were not written for experts or specialists. He published more than a dozen science books. From the mid-1860s on, he was one of the world's most famous living physicists, due firstly to his skill and industry as a tutorialist. Most of his books were translated into German and French with his main tutorials staying in print in those languages for decades.

As an indicator of his teaching attitude, here are his concluding remarks to the reader at the end of a 200-page tutorial book for a "youthful audience", The Forms of Water (1872): "Here, my friend, our labours close. It has been a true pleasure to me to have you at my side so long. In the sweat of our brows we have often reached the heights where our work lay, but you have been steadfast and industrious throughout, using in all possible cases your own muscles instead of relying upon mine. Here and there I have stretched an arm and helped you to a ledge, but the work of climbing has been almost exclusively your own. It is thus that I should like to teach you all things; showing you the way to profitable exertion, but leaving the exertion to you.... Our task seems plain enough, but you and I know how often we have had to wrangle resolutely with the facts to bring out their meaning. The work, however, is now done, and you are master of a fragment of that sure and certain knowledge which is founded on the faithful study of nature.... Here then we part. And should we not meet again, the memory of these days will still unite us. Give me your hand. Good bye."

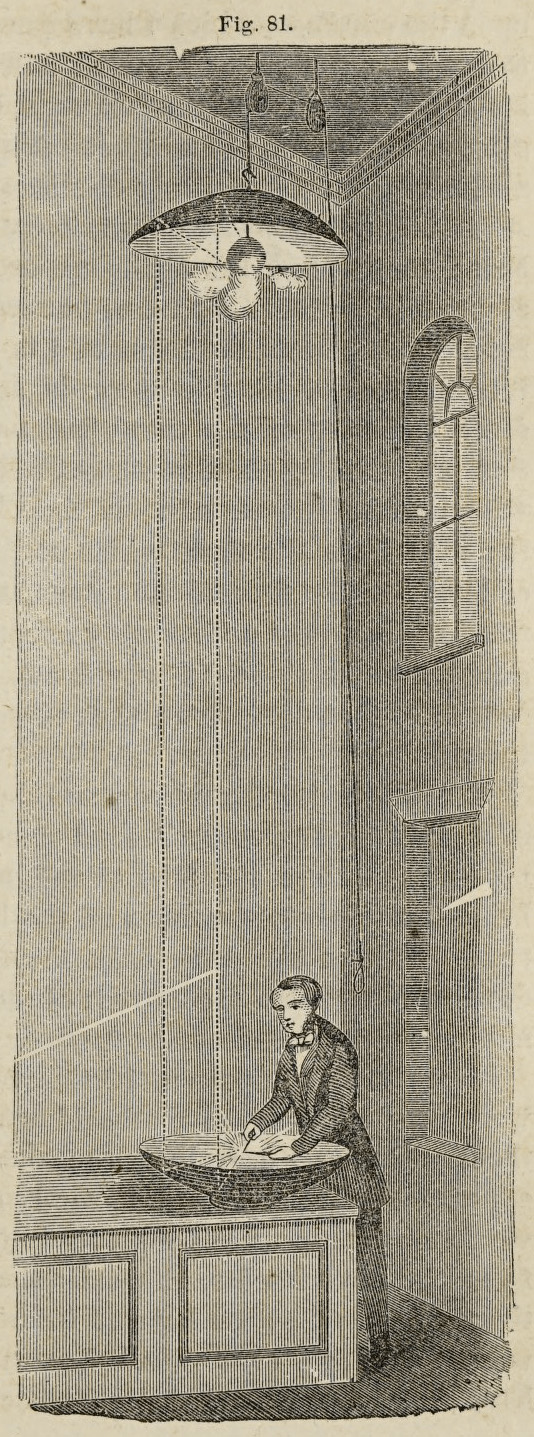
Tyndall's illustration of Pictet's experiment

As another indicator, here is the opening paragraph of his 350-page tutorial entitled Sound (1867): "In the following pages I have tried to render the science of acoustics interesting to all intelligent persons, including those who do not possess any special scientific culture. The subject is treated experimentally throughout, and I have endeavoured so to place each experiment before the reader that he should realise it as an actual operation." In the preface to the 3rd edition of this book, he reports that earlier editions were translated into Chinese at the expense of the Chinese government and translated into German under the supervision of Hermann von Helmholtz (a big name in the science of acoustics). His first published tutorial, which was about glaciers (1860), similarly states: "The work is written with a desire to interest intelligent persons who may not possess any special scientific culture."

His most widely praised tutorial, and probably his biggest seller, was the 550-page "Heat: a Mode of Motion" (1863; updated editions until 1880). It was in print for at least 50 years, and is in print today. Its primary feature is, as James Clerk Maxwell said in 1871, "the doctrines of the science [of heat] are forcibly impressed on the mind by well-chosen illustrative experiments."

Tyndall's three longest tutorials, namely Heat (1863), Sound (1867), and Light (1873), represented state-of-the-art experimental physics at the time they were written. Much of their contents were recent major innovations in the understanding of their respective subjects, which Tyndall was the first writer to present to a wider audience. One caveat is called for about the meaning of "state of the art". The books were devoted to laboratory science and they avoided mathematics. In particular, they contain absolutely no infinitesimal calculus. Mathematical modelling using infinitesimal calculus, especially differential equations, was a component of the state-of-the-art understanding of heat, light and sound at the time.

== Demarcation of science from religion ==
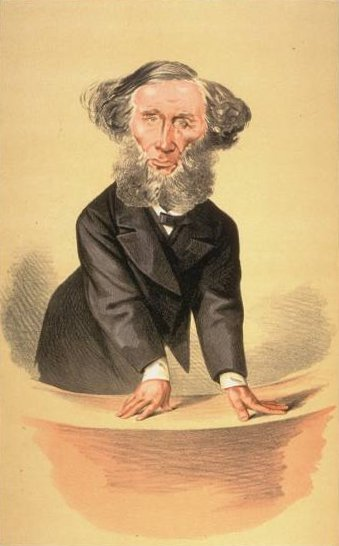
Tyndall caricatured as a preacher in the magazine Vanity Fair, 1872.

The majority of the progressive and innovative British physicists of Tyndall's generation were conservative and orthodox on matters of religion. That includes for example James Joule, Balfour Stewart, James Clerk Maxwell, George Gabriel Stokes and Lord Kelvin who all investigated heat or light contemporaneously with Tyndall. These conservatives believed, and sought to strengthen the basis for believing, that religion and science were consistent and harmonious with each other. Tyndall, however, was a member of the X Club, which vocally supported Charles Darwin's theory of evolution and sought to strengthen the barrier, or separation, between religion and science. The most prominent member of this club was the anatomist Thomas Henry Huxley. Tyndall first met Huxley in 1851 and the two had a lifelong friendship. Chemist Edward Frankland and mathematician Thomas Archer Hirst, both of whom Tyndall had known since before going to university in Germany, were members too. Others included the social philosopher Herbert Spencer.

Though not nearly so prominent as Huxley in controversy over philosophical problems, Tyndall played his part in communicating to the educated public what he thought were the virtues of having a clear separation between science (knowledge & rationality) and religion (faith & spirituality). As the elected president of the British Association for the Advancement of Science in 1874, he gave a long keynote speech at the Association's annual meeting held that year in Belfast. The speech gave a favourable account of the history of evolutionary theories, mentioning Darwin's name favourably more than 20 times, and concluded by asserting that religious sentiment should not be permitted to "intrude on the region of knowledge, over which it holds no command". This was a hot topic. The newspapers carried the report of it on their front pages – in Britain, Ireland & North America, even the European Continent – and many critiques of it appeared soon after. The attention and scrutiny increased the friends of the evolutionists' philosophical position, and brought it closer to mainstream ascendancy.

In Rome in 1864, Pope Pius IX in his Syllabus of Errors decreed that it was an error that "reason is the ultimate standard by which man can and ought to arrive at knowledge" and an error that "divine revelation is imperfect" in the Bible – and anyone maintaining those errors was to be "anathematized" – and in 1888 decreed as follows: "The fundamental doctrine of rationalism is the supremacy of the human reason, which, refusing due submission to the divine and eternal reason, proclaims its own independence... A doctrine of such character is most hurtful both to individuals and to the State... It follows that it is quite unlawful to demand, to defend, or to grant, unconditional [or promiscuous] freedom of thought, speech, writing, or religion." Those principles and Tyndall's principles were profound enemies. Luckily for Tyndall he didn't need to get into a contest with them in Britain. Even in Italy, Huxley and Darwin were awarded honorary medals and most of the Italian governing class was hostile to the papacy. But in Ireland during Tyndall's lifetime the majority of the population grew increasingly doctrinaire and vigorous in its Roman Catholicism and also grew stronger politically. Between 1886 and 1893, Tyndall was active in the debate in England about whether to give the Catholics of Ireland more freedom to go their own way. Like the great majority of Irish-born scientists of the 19th century he opposed the Irish Home Rule Movement. He had ardent views about it, which were published in newspapers and pamphlets. For example, in an opinion piece in The Times on 27 December 1890 he saw priests and Catholicism as "the heart and soul of this movement" and wrote that placing the non-Catholic minority under the dominion of "the priestly horde" would be "an unspeakable crime". He tried unsuccessfully to get the UK's premier scientific society to denounce the Irish Home Rule proposal as contrary to the interests of science.

In several essays included in his book Fragments of Science for Unscientific People, Tyndall attempted to dissuade people from believing in the potential effectiveness of prayers. At the same time, though, he was not broadly anti-religious.

Many of his readers interpret Tyndall to be a confirmed agnostic, though he never explicitly declared himself to be so. The following statement from Tyndall is an example of Tyndall's agnostic mindset, made in 1867, and reiterated in 1878: "The phenomena of matter and force come within our intellectual range... but behind, and above, and around us the real mystery of the universe lies unsolved, and, as far as we are concerned, is incapable of solution.... Let us lower our heads, and acknowledge our ignorance, priest and philosopher, one and all."

== Personal life ==
Tyndall did not marry until age 55. His bride, Louisa Hamilton, was the 30-year-old daughter of a member of parliament (Lord Claud Hamilton, M.P.). The following year, 1877, they built a summer chalet at Belalp in the Swiss Alps. Before getting married Tyndall had been living for many years in an upstairs apartment at the Royal Institution and continued living there after marriage until 1885 when he and Louisa moved to a house near Haslemere 45 miles southwest of London. The marriage was a happy one and without children. He retired from the Royal Institution at age 66 having complaints of ill health.

Tyndall became financially well-off from sales of his popular books and fees from his lectures (but there is no evidence that he owned commercial patents). For many years he got non-trivial payments for being a part-time scientific advisor to a couple of quasi-governmental agencies and partly donated the payments to charity. His successful lecture tour of the United States in 1872 netted him a substantial amount of dollars, all of which he promptly donated to a trustee for fostering science in America. Late in life his money donations went most visibly to the Irish Unionist political cause. When he died, his wealth was £22,122. For comparison's sake, the income of a police constable in London was about £80 per year at the time.

== Death ==
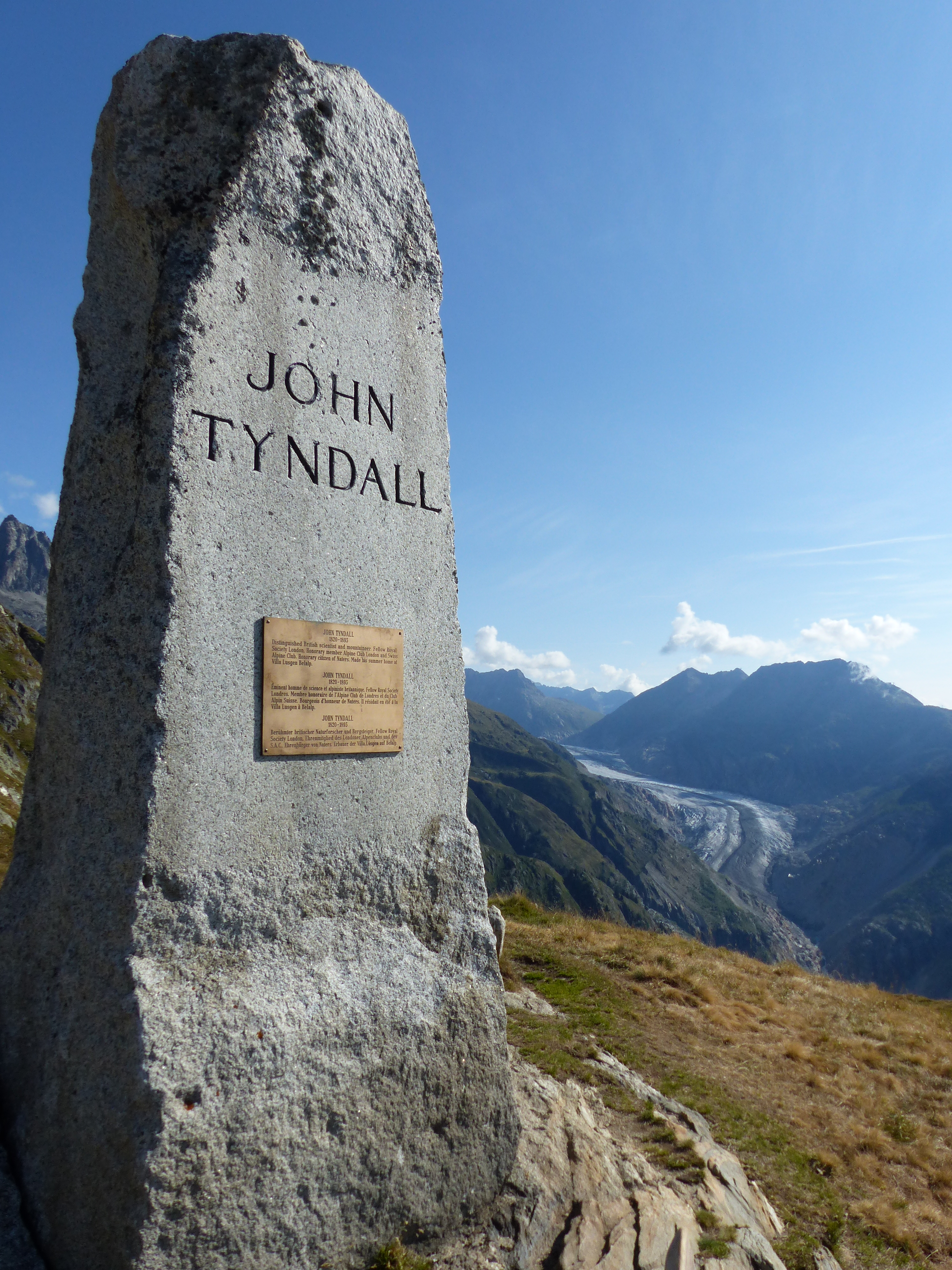
The Swiss memorial to John Tyndall, with the Aletsch Glacier in the background

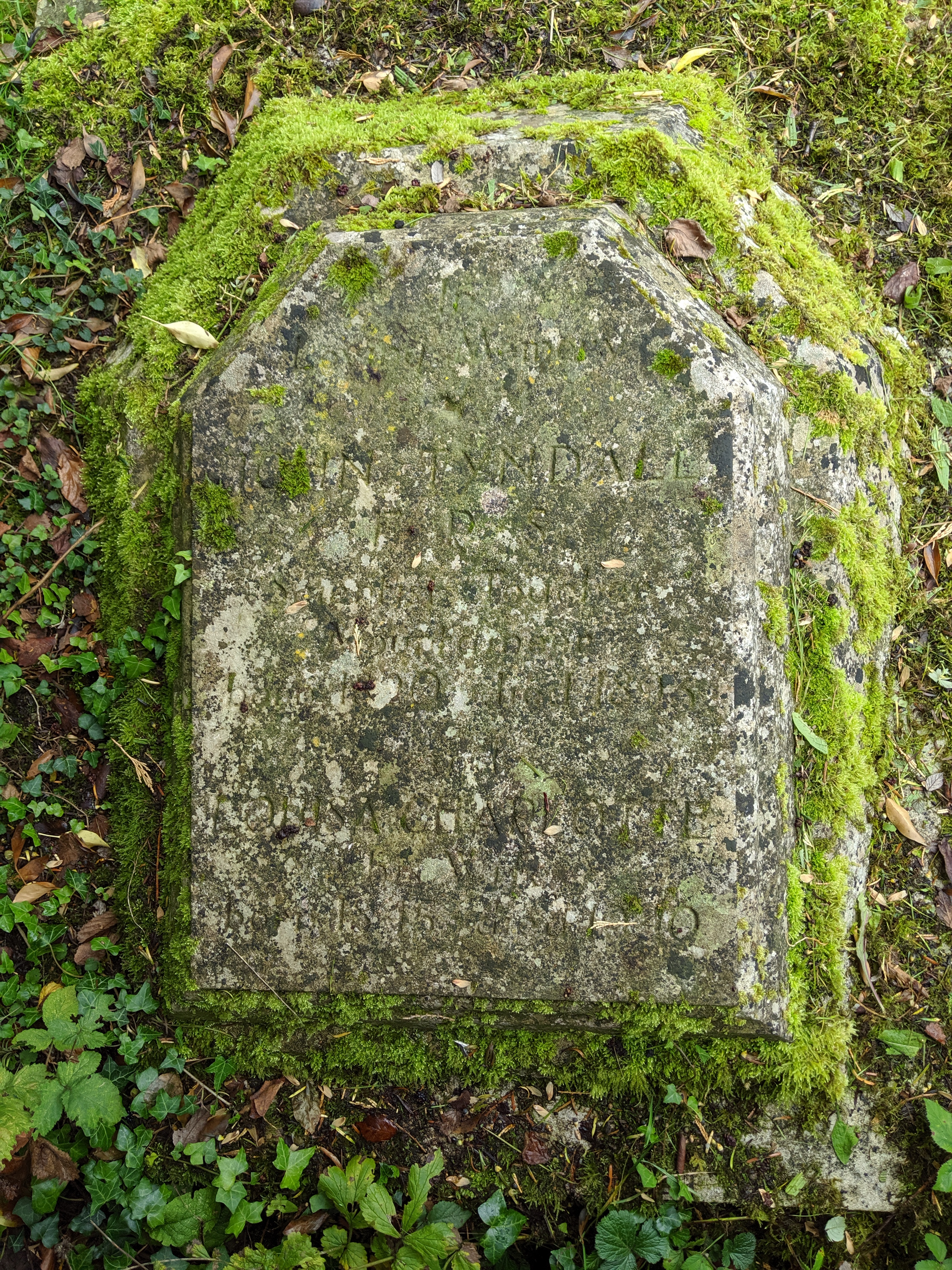
Tyndall's grave in St Bartholomew's churchyard, Haslemere, Surrey U.K.

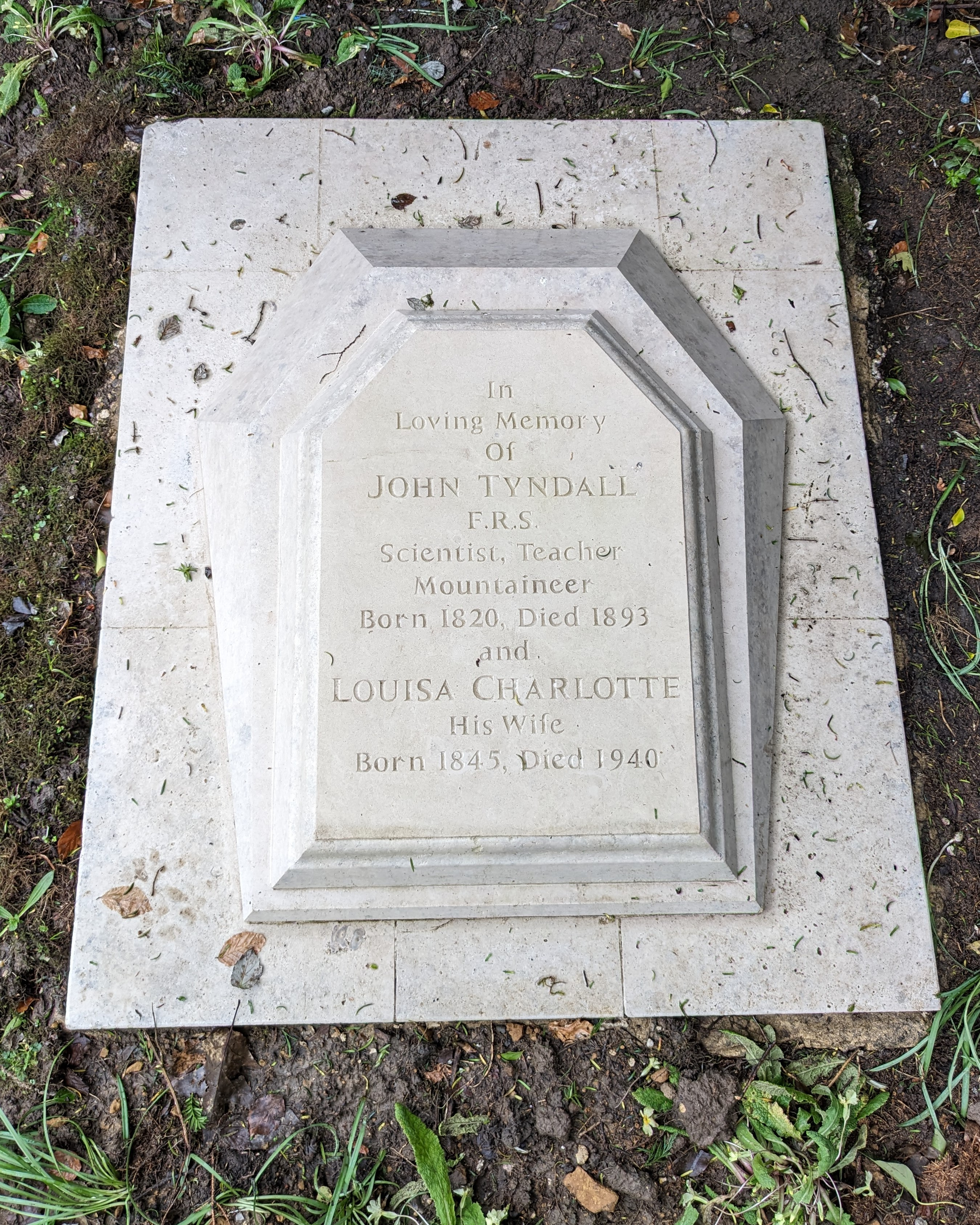
The gravestone of John and Louisa Tyndall (2024)

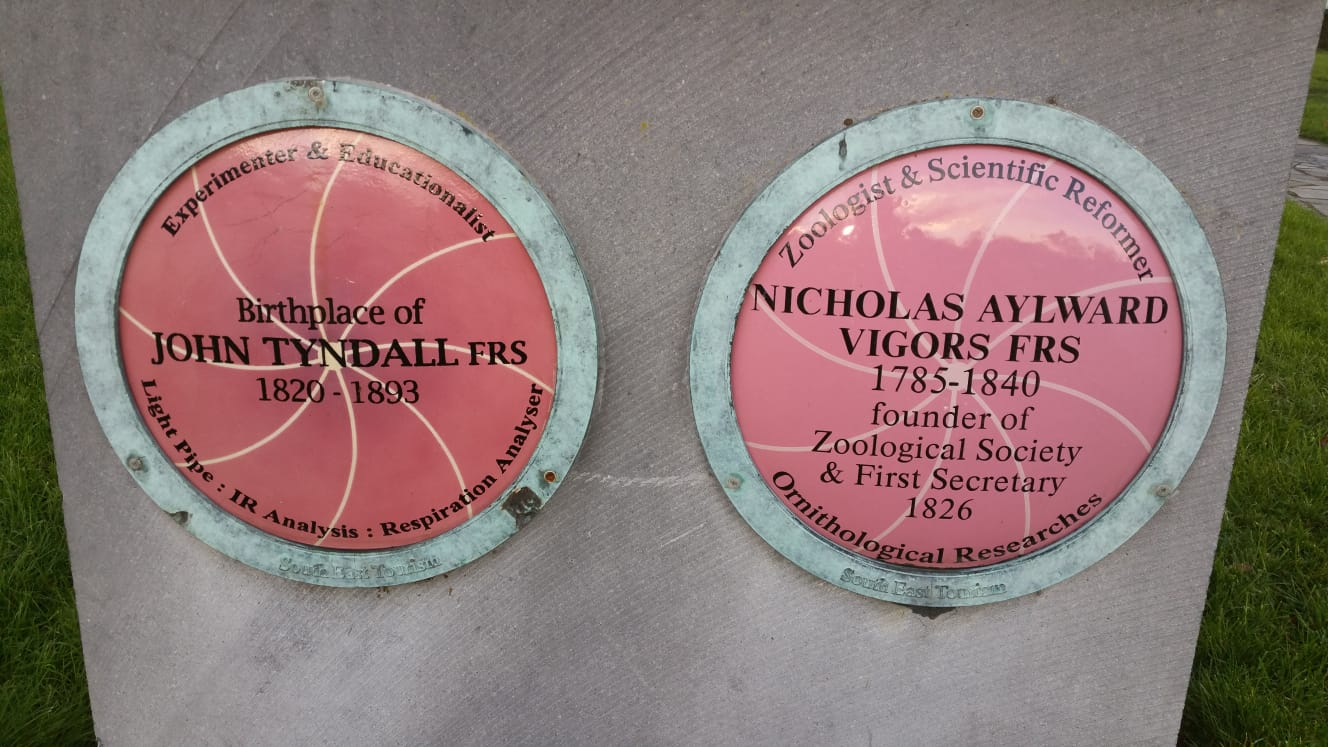
Plaques to Tyndall and Nicholas Aylward Vigors in Leighlinbridge

In his last years Tyndall often took chloral hydrate to treat his insomnia. When bedridden and ailing, he died from an accidental overdose of this drug in 1893 at the age of 73, and was buried at Haslemere. The overdose was administered by his wife Louisa. "My darling," said Tyndall when he realized what had happened, "you have killed your John."

Afterwards, Tyndall's wife took possession of his papers and assigned herself supervisor of an official biography of him. She procrastinated on the project, however, and it was still unfinished when she died in 1940 aged 95. The book eventually appeared in 1945, written by A. S. Eve and C. H. Creasey, whom Louisa Tyndall had authorised shortly before her death.

John Tyndall is commemorated by a memorial (the Tyndalldenkmal) erected at an elevation of 2,340 metres (7,680 ft) on the mountain slopes above the Swiss village of Belalp, where he had his holiday home, and in sight of the Aletsch Glacier, which he had studied.

== Legacy and Commemorations ==
The Tyndall National Institute in Cork, Ireland, is named after Tyndall. It is a leading European research centre in integrated ICT materials, devices and systems and is partnered with University College Cork.

There is a school dedicated to John Tyndall located in his home county of Carlow: Tyndall College is a co-educational post-primary educational institution located along the Kilkenny Road in County Carlow. The institution started its operations in 2017 following the merger of the Carlow Vocational School, and the name of the institution was given in recognition of Tyndall's contributions to science and Irish heritage. Tyndall College is a multi-denominational educational institution run by the Department of Education in the Republic of Ireland that offers education to the student population in County Carlow.

A lecture theatre in the University of Galway Science Block is named after Tyndall.

The Tyndall Centre for Climate Change Research based at the University of East Anglia is named in his honour.

== Books ==
- Tyndall, J. (1860), The glaciers of the Alps, Being a narrative of excursions and ascents, an account of the origin and phenomena of glaciers and an exposition of the physical principles to which they are related, (1861 edition) Ticknor and Fields, Boston
- Tyndall, J. (1862), Mountaineering in 1861. A vacation tour, Longman, Green, Longman, and Roberts, London
- Tyndall, J. (1865), On Radiation: One Lecture (40 pages)
- Tyndall, J. (1868), Heat : A mode of motion, (1869 edition) D. Appleton, New York
- Tyndall, J. (1869), Natural Philosophy in Easy Lessons (180 pages) (a physics book intended for use in secondary schools)
- Tyndall, J. (1870), Faraday as a discoverer, Longmans, Green, London
- Tyndall, J. (1870), Three Scientific Addresses by Prof. John Tyndall (75 pages)
- Tyndall, J. (1870), Notes of a Course of Nine Lectures on Light (80 pages)
- Tyndall, J. (1870), Notes of a Course of Seven Lectures on Electrical Phenomena and Theories (50 pages)
- Tyndall, J. (1870), Researches on diamagnetism and magne-crystallic action: including the question of diamagnetic polarity, (a compilation of 1850s research reports), Longmans, Green, London
- Tyndall, J. (1871), Hours of exercise in the Alps, Longmans, Green, and Co., London
- Tyndall, J. (1871), Fragments of Science: A Series of Detached Essays, Lectures, and Reviews, (1872 edition), Longmans, Green, London
- Tyndall, J. (1872), Contributions to Molecular Physics in the Domain of Radiant Heat, (a compilation of 1860s research reports), (1873 edition), D. Appleton and Company, New York
- Tyndall, J. (1873), The forms of water in clouds & rivers, ice & glaciers, H. S. King & Co., London
- Tyndall, J. (1873), Six Lectures on Light (290 pages)
- Tyndall, J. (1876), Lessons in Electricity at the Royal Institution (100 pages), (intended for secondary school students)
- Tyndall, J. (1878), Sound; delivered in eight lectures, (1969 edition), Greenwood Press, New York
- Tyndall, J. (1882), Essays on the floating matter of the air, in relation to putrefaction and infection, D. Appleton, New York
- Tyndall, J. (1887), Light and electricity: notes of two courses of lectures before the Royal Institution of Great Britain, D. Appleton and Company, New York
- Tyndall, J. (1892), New Fragments (miscellaneous essays for a broad audience), D. Appleton, New York

== See also ==
- Ice sheet dynamics
- Greenhouse gas
- John Tyndall's system for measuring radiant heat absorption in gases

== Sources ==
=== Biographies of Tyndall ===
- Eve, A.S.; Creasey, C.H. (1945). Life and Work of John Tyndall. London: Macmillan. 430 pages. This is the "official" biography.
- William Tulloch Jeans wrote a 100-page biography of Professor Tyndall in 1887 (the year Tyndall retired from the Royal Institution). Downloadable. See also The Lives of Electricians: Professors Tyndall, Wheatstone, and Morse. (1887, Whittaker & Co.)
- Louisa Charlotte Tyndall, his wife, wrote an 8-page biography of John Tyndall that was published in 1899 in Dictionary of National Biography (volume 57). It is readable online (and a 1903 republication of the same biography is also readable online).
- Edward Frankland, a longtime friend, wrote a 16-page biography of John Tyndall as an obituary in 1894 in a scientific journal. It is readable online.
- D. Thompson (1957). "John Tyndall (1820–1893): A study in vocational enterprise". Journal of Vocational Education & Training. 9 (18): 38–48. doi:10.1080/03057875780000061. Gives an account of Tyndall's vocational development prior to 1853.
- Brock, W.H. (1981). John Tyndall, Essays on a Natural Philosopher. Dublin: Royal Dublin Society. 220 pages.
- Arthur Whitmore Smith, a professor of physics, wrote a 10-page biography of John Tyndall in 1920 in a scientific monthly. Readable online.
- Anon (1894). "Obituary notices". Journal of the Chemical Society, Transactions. 65: 389–393. doi:10.1039/CT8946500382.
- John Walter Gregory, a naturalist, wrote a 9-page obituary of John Tyndall in 1894 in a natural science journal. Readable online.
- An early, 8-page profile of John Tyndall appeared in 1864 in Portraits of Men of Eminence in Literature, Science and Art, Volume II, pages 25–32.
- A brief profile of Tyndall based on information supplied by Tyndall himself appeared in 1874 in "Scientific worthies, IV.--John Tyndall". Nature. 10 (251): 299–302. 1874. Bibcode:1874Natur..10..299.. doi:10.1038/010299a0..
- Claud Schuster, John Tyndall as a Mountaineer, 56-page essay included in Schuster's book Postscript to Adventure, year 1950 (New Alpine Library: Eyre & Spottiswoode, London).
- DeYoung, Ursula (2011). A Vision of Modern Science: John Tyndall and the Role of the Scientist in Victorian Culture. Palgrave Macmillan. pp. 280. ISBN 978-0-230-11053-3..
- Jackson, Roland (2018). The Ascent of John Tyndall. Oxford University Press. p. 556. ISBN 9780198788959. The first major biography of Tyndall since 1945.
- Chisholm, Hugh, ed. (1911). "Tyndall, John" . Encyclopædia Britannica. Vol. 27 (11th ed.). Cambridge University Press. pp. 499–500.
