= Shushary, Saint Petersburg =

Settlement belonging to the Russian city of St. Petersburg

Coordinates: 59°48′50″N 30°23′08″E

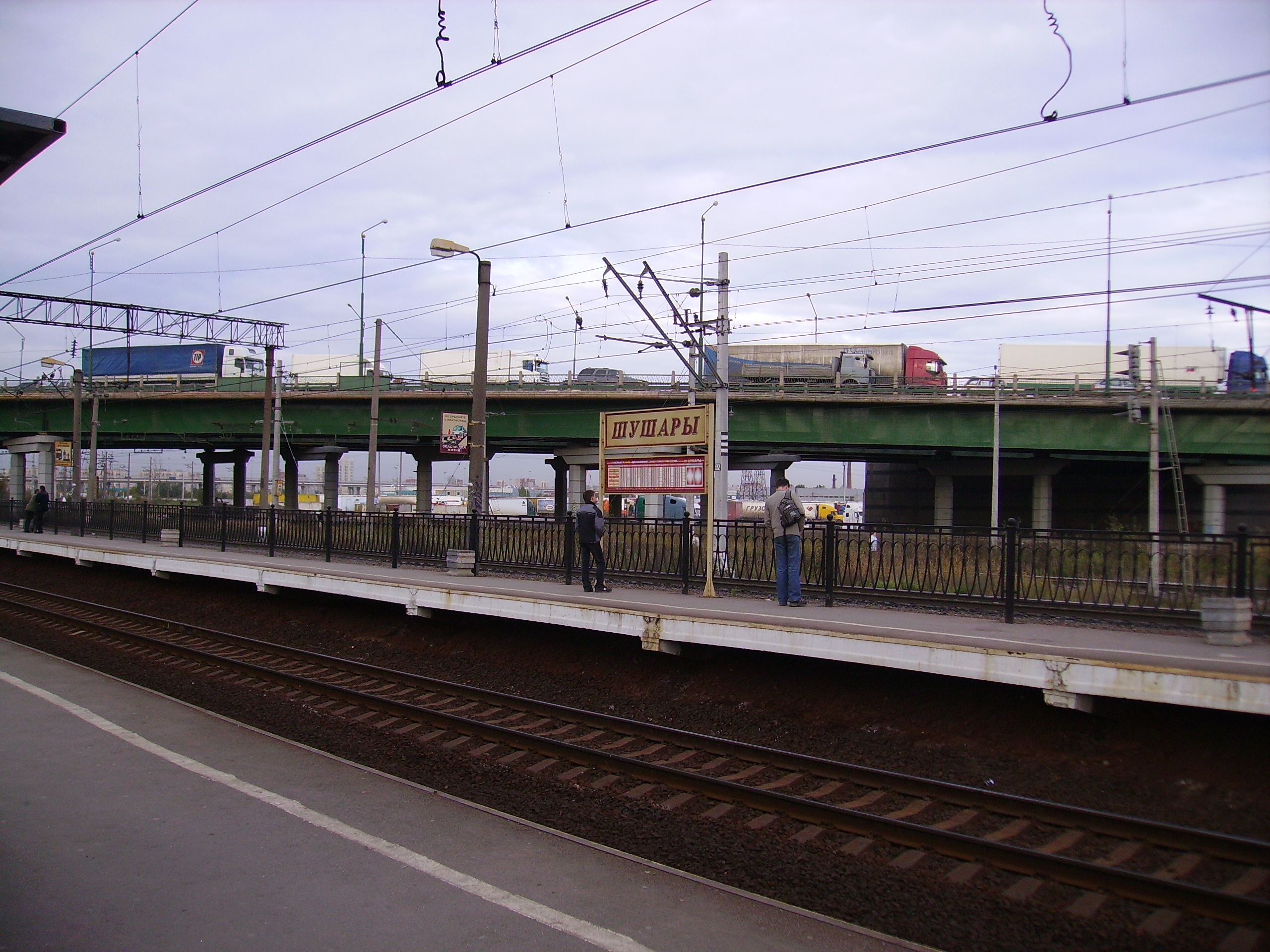
Shushary railway station

Shushary (Russian: Шуша́ры, from Finnish Suosaari, "marshy island") is a municipal settlement in Pushkinsky District of the federal city of St. Petersburg, Russia, located on the slopes of the Pulkovo Heights. Population: 22,652 (2010 census); 15,843 (2002 census); 4,789 (1989 Soviet census).

The original village of Susari is mentioned in documents dating back to 1704.

Shushary gained importance in 1838 as the location of the first railway siding in the Russian Empire and one of the first railway stations in the country. A living-history steam-engine museum chronicles the town's long association with the Russian Railways.

In the beginning of the 21st century, Shushary was transformed into an industrial area comprising automotive plants such as Toyota, General Motors (now owned by Hyundai), and Magna International.
