= Yardley =

Yardley may refer to:

== People ==
=== Surname ===
- Bruce Yardley (1947–2019), Australian cricketer
- David Yardley (1929–2014), British legal scholar and public servant
- Doyle Yardley (1913–1946), American military officer
- Eric Yardley (born 1990), American professional baseball pitcher
- Evan Yardley (born 1993), Welsh rugby union player
- George Yardley (1928–2004), American basketball player
- George Yardley (footballer) (1942–2018), Scottish footballer
- Herbert Yardley (1889–1958), American cryptologist
- Jane Yardley, English 20th-century author
- Jim Yardley (born 1964), American journalist
- Jim Yardley (cricketer) (1946–2010), English first-class cricketer
- Jimmy Yardley (1903–1959), Scottish professional footballer
- John Yardley (disambiguation), multiple people
  - John Yardley (painter) (born 1933), English watercolor artist and self-taught painter
  - John F. Yardley (1925–2001), American engineer
  - John H. Yardley (1926–2011), American pathologist
- Jonathan Yardley (born 1939), book critic (Washington Post and Washington Star)
- Kathleen Yardley or Kathleen Lonsdale (1903–1971), Irish crystallographer, pacificst, and prison reform activist
- Lucy Yardley (born 1961), British psychologist and professor of health psychology
- Malcolm Yardley (1940–2020), British sprinter
- Mark Yardley (born 1969), Scottish professional footballer
- Maud H. Yardley (1867–1954), British writer
- Norman Yardley (1915–1989), English cricketer
- Ralph O. Yardley (1878–1961), American cartoonist
- Richard Q. Yardley (1903–1979), American editorial cartoonist
- Robert Yardley (disambiguation), multiple people
  - Robert Blake Yardley (1858–1943), British barrister and philatelist
  - Robert Morris Yardley (1850–1902), Republican politician from Pennsylvania
- Ryan Yardley (born 1998), New Zealand racing driver
- Stephen Yardley (born 1942), English actor
- Tracy Yardley (born 1979), American comic book artist
- William Yardley (disambiguation), multiple people
  - William Yardley (cricketer) (1849–1900), English cricketer
  - William Yardley (judge) (1810–1878), British judge
  - William Yardley (settler) (1632–1693), early settler of Bucks County, Pennsylvania
  - William F. Yardley (1844–1924), American attorney, politician and civil rights advocate

=== Given name ===
- Yardley Chittick (1900–2008), for several years the oldest living patent attorney in the US
- Yardley Griffin (born 1979), American gospel musician, recording artist, worship leader
- Yardley Taylor (1794–1868), Quaker living in Goose Creek, Loudoun County, Virginia
- Yardley Warner (1815–1885), American educator, lawyer and minister

== Places ==
- John Yardley House, house in Beaver, Utah
- Yardley, Pennsylvania, United States
- Yardley, a province of the former West Indies Federation
- Yardley, Birmingham, an area of Birmingham city, UK
- Birmingham Yardley (UK Parliament constituency)
- South Yardley, electoral ward in Birmingham, England
- Yardley Chase, 357.6 hectare biological Site of Special Scientific Interest, mostly in Northamptonshire, England
- Yardley Court, school in Tonbridge, Kent, England
- Yardley Gobion, village in Northamptonshire, England
- Yardley Hastings, village in Northamptonshire, England
- Yardley Historic District, historic district in Yardley, Pennsylvania
- Yardley station, SEPTA Regional Rail station in Yardley, Pennsylvania
- Yardley Wood, area of Birmingham, United Kingdom
- Yardley Wood railway station, West Midlands Trains railway station in Yardley Wood, England
- Yardley-Wilburtha Bridge across the Delaware River

== Business ==
- E.S. Yardley & Co., known as Smith and Yardley, a firm of railway signalling and signal box contractors in Manchester, England
- Yardley & District RFC, English rugby union club
- Yardley Inn, restaurant in Bucks County, Pennsylvania
- Yardley London, a British personal care company

== See also ==
- Ardley (disambiguation)
- Yardy (disambiguation)
- Yardie (disambiguation)
- Yeardley (disambiguation)
