= Quaker missionaries =

Religious missionary efforts

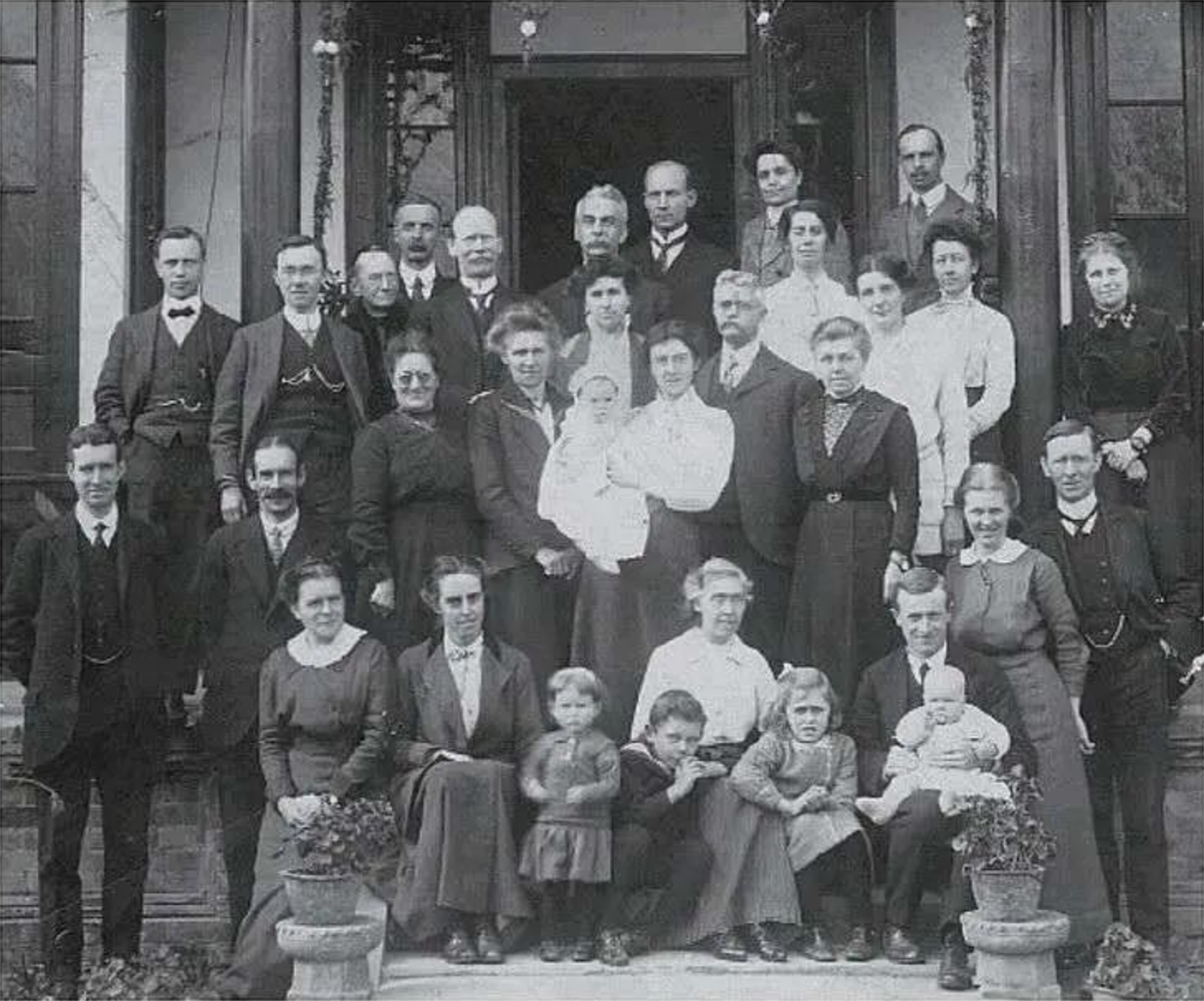
Quaker missionaries in Sz-chwan, 1916

Quakers, or the Religious Society of Friends, have been making missionary efforts for centuries. Men and women have made efforts from home and gone abroad to preach their religious message.

== Missionary efforts ==
Quakerism has no ordained clergy. All, regardless of gender, are allowed to minister.

It has been said that, "Most Quaker traveling preachers conformed to the 'evangelical' category in their attempt to annihilate their personal will to submit to the sovereign will of God."

=== Women's experience ===
In the Quaker community, it is argued that a higher emphasis has been placed on religiosity rather than home life for women. A significant proportion of Quaker women never married, were widowed, or married late without having children. This allowed women more freedom to pursue religious obligations. Some women chose husbands who were "sympathetic" to their religious pursuits. Female missionaries were mandated to work in pairs of the same sex. Some of these paired women remained close friends for years or even the rest of their lives. Mary Capper and Mary Beesley were one such pair.

A Quaker diary in the Orient

Quaker pioneers in Russia

Missionary work sometimes called for frequent travel. Quaker women were encouraged to record their sufferings in the face of their faith. These women experienced not only the perils of traveling in the Early Modern Period but also persecution and imprisonment. Women were not alone in facing trials; their families also faced persecution. In England, for example, the Quaker Act of 1662 and other acts led to the imprisonment and death of over 10,000 Quakers. Many of these writings were published and distributed, especially in the Atlantic world.

== Chronology of Quaker missionaries ==
=== 17th century or 1600s ===
- Ann Austin and Mary Fisher were English Quaker who preached in North America.
- Hester Biddle ministered in Ireland, Scotland, Newfoundland, the Netherlands, Barbados, Alexandria, and France.
- Sarah Blackborow was an early English Quaker and author.
- Barbara Blaugdone was an English Quaker. She traveled throughout England and Ireland in her ministering efforts. She was jailed and fined several times for sharing her beliefs.
- Alice Curwen ministered in the Caribbean and New England.
- Katherine Evans and Sarah Cheevers ministered throughout Europe.They traveled on missions to Scotland, Ireland, and various parts of England. Soon thereafter, they decided to journey to Alexandria. Rachel Warburton claimed that, "Traveling together, part of their purpose was to follow Paul's travels, but they also hoped to meet with and to convert the Sultan." They are best known for an account of their imprisonment by the Roman Inquisition in Malta.
- Henry Fell was English. He ministered in Barbados and America.
- George Keith was Scottish. He was a Quaker for part of his life. While he was part of the Religious Society of Friends, he did missionary work in the Netherlands and Germany.
- Thomas Loe was a missionary who influenced William Penn, another Quaker missionary.
- John Perrot was likely Irish-born. He converted to Quakerism sometime before 1656 from the Baptist faith. He preached in Ireland, Italy, England, the West Indies, and Virginia.
- Hannah Stranger was a Quaker who did missionary work in England.
- Joan Vokins (née Bunce) was an early Quaker missionary from England. She preached in British Colonial America, the West Indian Islands, Ireland, and England.
- The Valiant Sixty were a group of Quaker preachers from northern England that made missionary efforts Great Britain, Europe, North America, and Turkey. Some of the members of this group were teenagers when they started their missionary work. James Nayler (or Naylor) Christopher Atkinson were members.

=== 19th century or 1800s ===
Missionary efforts in Asia and Africa were made in the latter-part of the century and into the next.

- Cornelis "Kees" Boeke was a Dutch Quaker. He did missionary work in England, the Netherlands, and what is now Lebanon.
- John Cadbury was an English Quaker who traveled to Ireland several times for missionary work. He was also the founder of the Cadbury confectionary company.
- Robert John Davidson and his wife Mary Jane Davidson were Irish Quakers who worked in Sichuan.
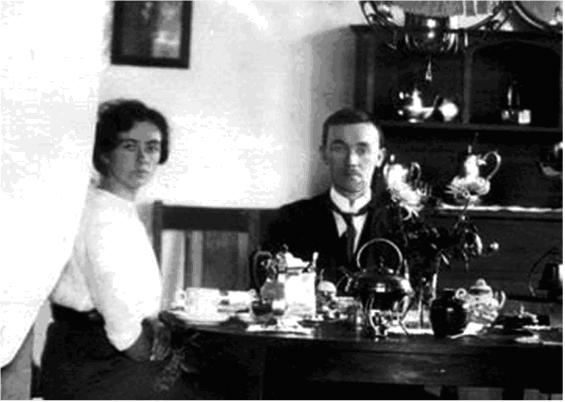
  Robert John Davidson and his wife Mary Jane Davidson at Chengtu
- Stephen Grellet was a French-American Quaker. He did missionary work throughout Europe and North America.
- Charlotte Hanbury was a British missionary who ministered in Morocco.
- Sybil Jones was an American Quaker who did missionary work in North America, the West Indies, Europe, and the coast of Africa.
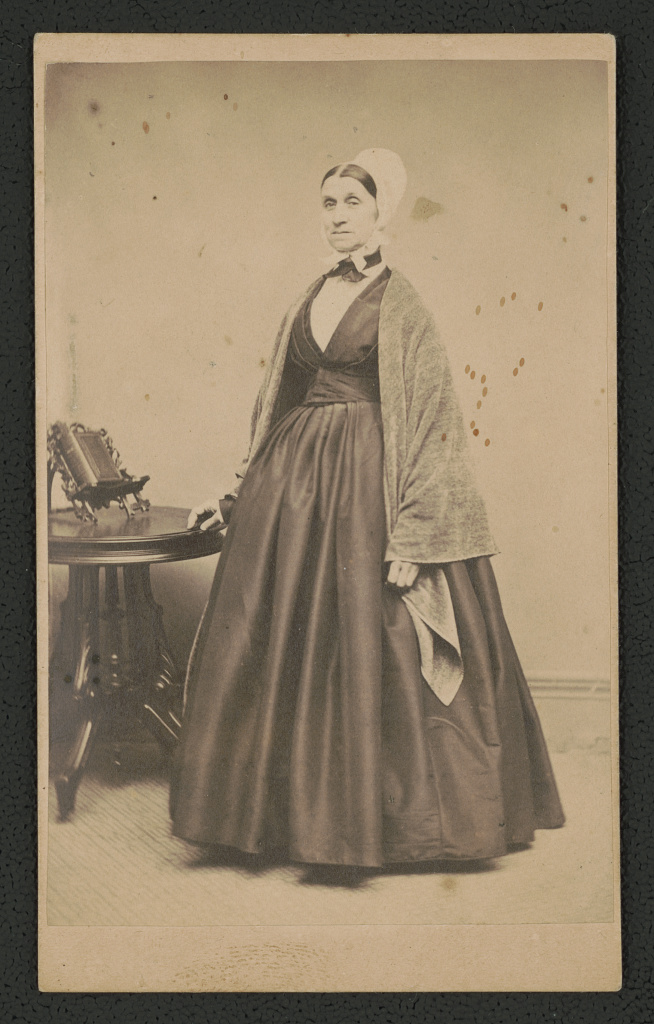
  Sybil Jones
- Lindley Murray Hoag was a Quaker missionary throughout the United States and Europe.
- Hannah Kilham (née Spurr) was missionary known for her philanthropic and linguistic efforts. She traveled in Ireland and West Africa.
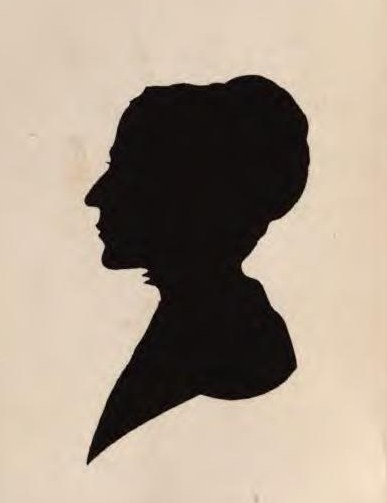
  Silhouette portrait of Hannah Kilham (1774–1832) née Spurr, an English Methodist and Quaker, known as a missionary and linguist active in West Africa
- Dorothy Ripley was a British Quaker that spent her life traveling in and between Britain and the United States of America. She was especially involved in ministering to Native Americans, prisoners, and African slaves.
- Theophilus Waldmeier was Swiss-born. He had a deeply religious upbringing and eventually joined the Quakers. His missionary work was focused in the Middle East and northern Africa.
- George Washington Walker was an English-born Quaker. He traveled and made missionary efforts with James Blackhouse in Australia, Mauritius, and South Africa
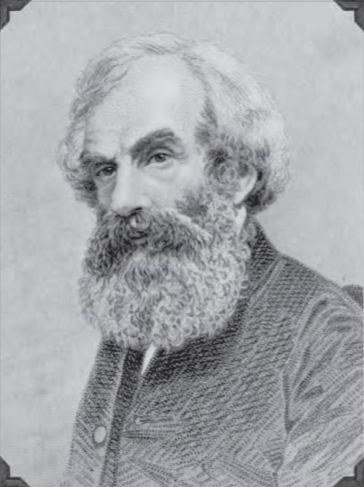
- James Backhouse, botanist and missionary for the Quaker church in Australia
  Daniel Wheeler was a British Quaker who made missionaries efforts in Russia, the South Pacific, and North America.
- John Yeardley was born in Yorkshire, England. He joined the Quakers in 1806 and started preaching in 1815. Among his travels, Yeardley visited Germany, France, Norway, South Russia, and Constantinople. In 1826, he married fellow Quaker, Martha Savory.

=== 20th century or 1900s ===
- William Warder Cadbury was an American Quaker. He was a medical missionary in China, where he lived for 40 years.
- Michael Coates did missionary work in South Africa, where he befriended Gandhi and ministered to him.
- Henry Theodore Hodgkin was a British Quaker. He did missionary work in China and the United States. He served in a variety of positions and helped found the first Christian pacifist movement and the West China Union University in Chengdu.
- Thomas Raymond Kelly was an American Quaker. He was known for his education efforts. His missionary work in Germany helped to found the Quaker community there.
- Isaac Mason and his wife Esther were Quakers who did missionary work in West China. Isaac Mason was the first to translate Quaker writings into Chinese.
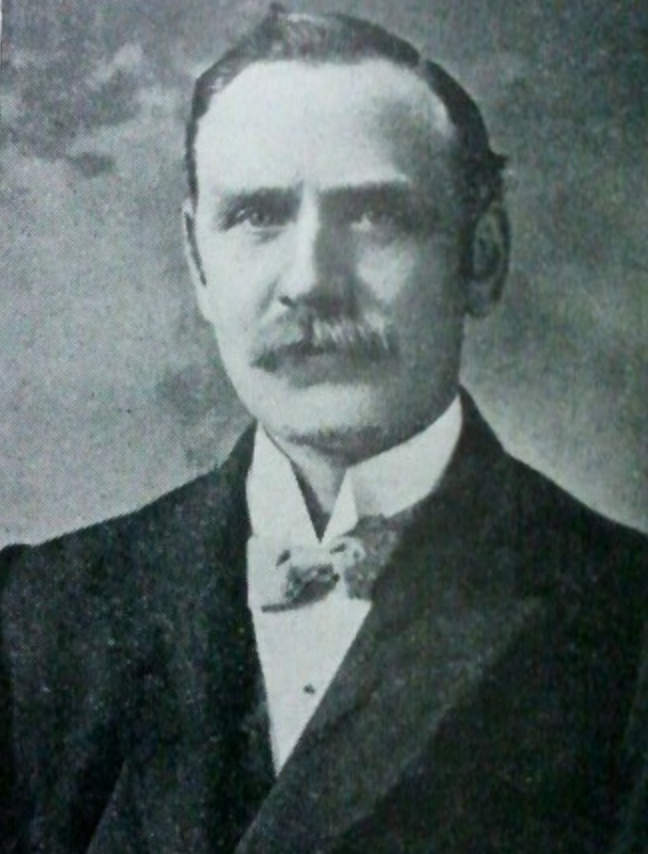
  Isaac Mason, a British Quaker missionary stationed in Szechwan. He was the husband of Esther L. Mason, also a Quaker missionary.
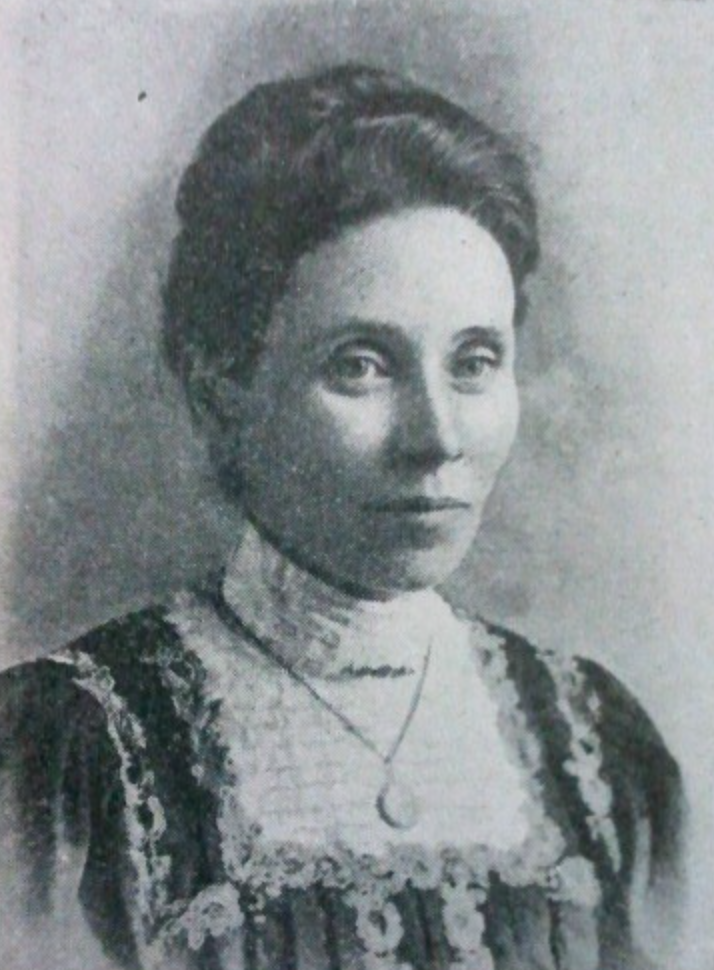
  Esther L. Mason, a British Quaker missionary stationed in Szechwan
- Herbert Victor Nicholson was an American Quaker. He was a missionary in Japan for 25 years and later supported Japanese Americans in internment camps during World War II.
- H.T. Silcock was English. He went to China as a missionary and teacher as part of the Friends' Foreign Mission Association (FFMA).
- Herbert Fox Standing was an English Quaker that served as a medical missionary in Madagascar.
- Satyananda Stokes (born Samuel Evans Stokes, Jr.) was an American Quaker that settle in India. He spent his life serving the people there.
- Clifford Morgan Stubbs was a New Zealand Quaker who did missionary work in West China.
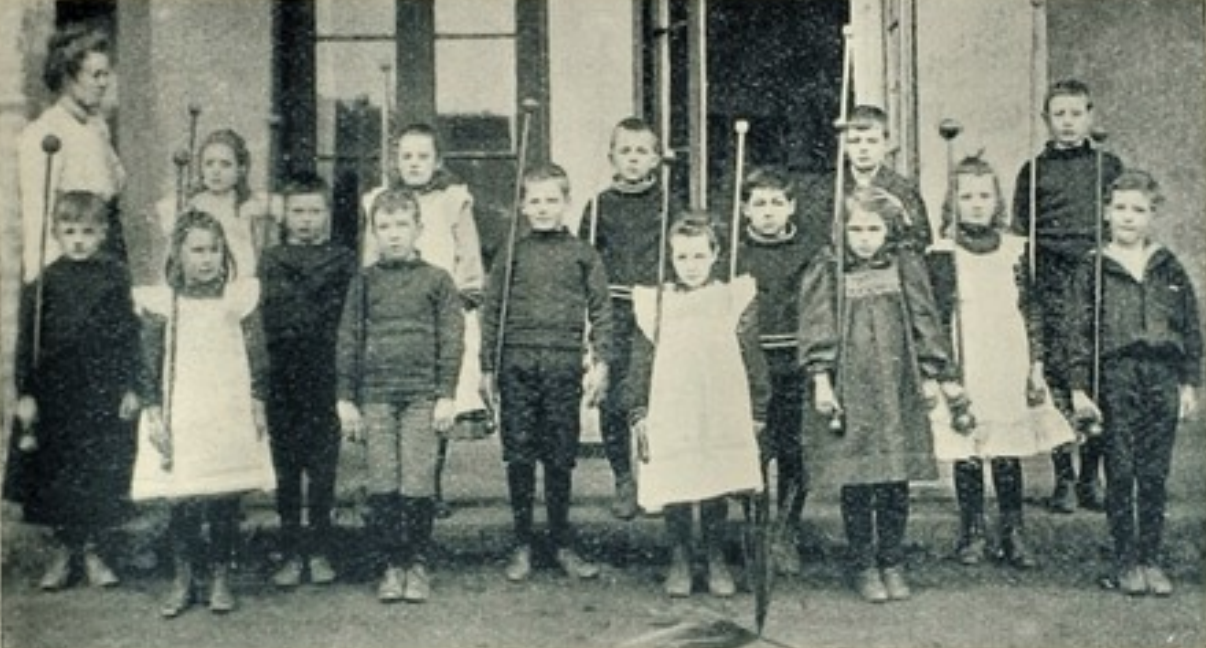
  Children at the School for Missionaries' children erected on the hills, on the south of river Yang Tse, opposite Chungking, opened in March, 1898. Five children of Friend Missionaries have been at the Hill School here: R. Huntley Davidson, Wilfred S. and Mabel Wigham, M. Irene Mason, and B. Ellwood Jackson.
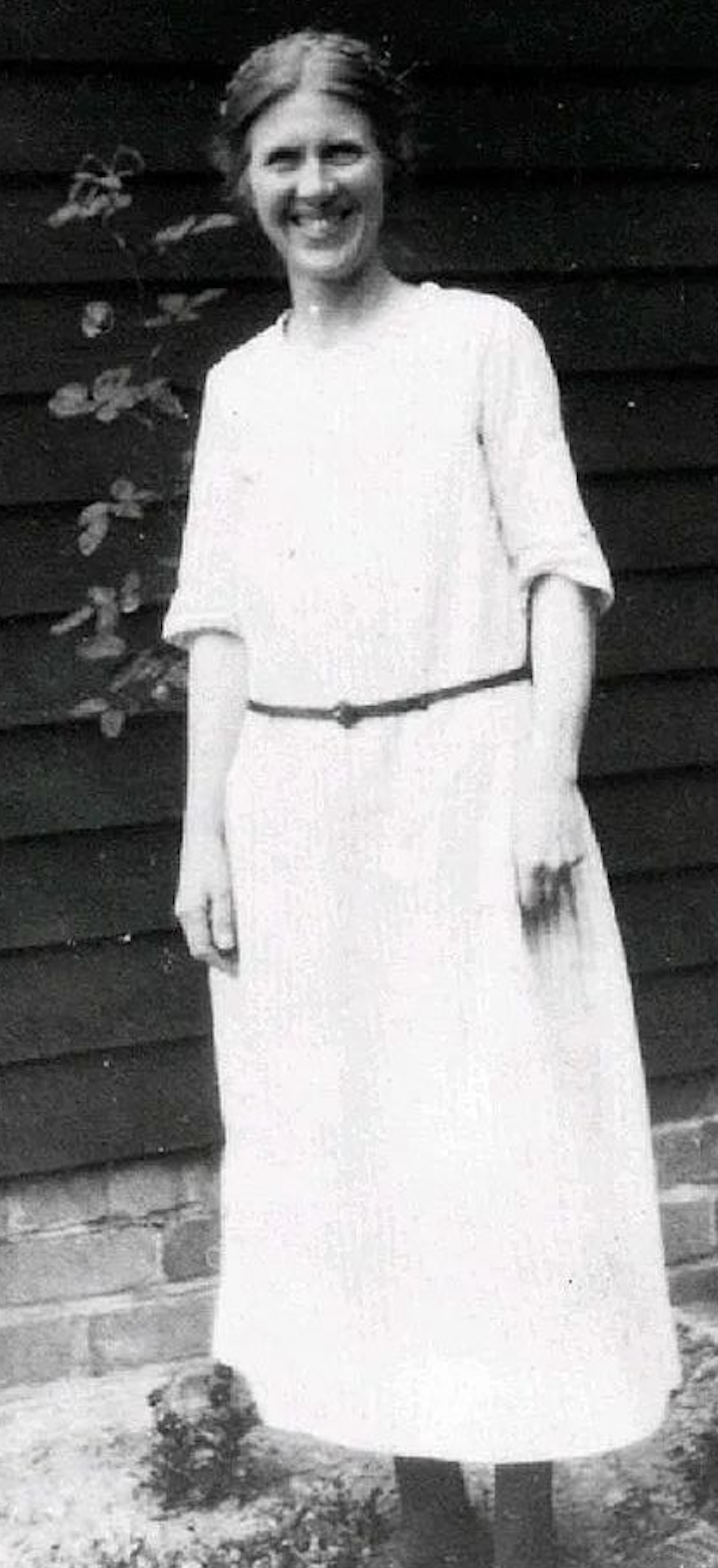
  Margaret Stubbs, wife of Clifford Morgan Stubbs

== See also ==
- British Friends Service Council (FSC), later called Quaker Peace and Social Witness
- American Friends Service Committee (AFSC)
- Quakers
- Quakerism in Sichuan
- Quaker views on women
- Women in Church History
