= Yeardley =

Yeardley (also: Yeardlea, Yeardlee, Yeardleigh, Yeardlie, or Yardley) is a given name and a surname. The name means "enclosed meadow". As a given name, it is predominantly a male's name but may also be a female's name.

Notable people with the given name Yeardley include voice actress Yeardley Smith and lacrosse player and murder victim Yeardley Love. Nicknames given to Yeardley are "Lee" and "Yard".

A notable person with the surname Yeardley is George Yeardley (1587–1627), plantation owner and Governor of Virginia.

== List ==
=== Given name "Yeardley" ===
- Yeardley Love (1987–2010), Virginia murder victim
- Yeardley Smith (Martha Maria Yeardley Smith) (born 1964), actress, stars on The Simpsons

=== Surname "Yeardley" ===
- Temperance Flowerdew Yeardley (1590–1628), wife of governor George Yeardley
- George Yeardley (1587–1627), governor of British Virginia
- John Yeardley (1786–1858), Quaker missionary
- Martha Savory Yeardley (1781–1851), English poet

== See also ==
- Yardley
