= William Yardley =

William Yardley may refer to:

- William Yardley (cricketer) (1849–1900), English cricketer
- William Yardley (judge) (1810–1878), British judge
- William Yardley (settler) (1632–1693), American colonial settler
- William F. Yardley (1844–1924), American attorney, politician and civil rights advocate from Tennessee
