= John Yardley =

John Yardley may refer to:

- John Yardley (painter) (born 1933), English watercolor painter
- John F. Yardley (1925–2001), American engineer
- John H. Yardley (c. 1926–2011), American pathologist
