= Charles Tylor =

English Quaker author (1816–1902)

Charles Tylor (2 November 1816 – 14 March 1902) was an English Quaker author. He was the founding editor of Quaker weekly publication, The Friend. He was a Recorded Minister of the Religious Society of Friends.

== Life and career ==
Tylor was born in Cripplegate, London, England, the son of Joseph Tylor (1780–1836) and Sarah Maria (Savory) (1789–Deceased), his wife. He trained as a Barrister but did not practice, opting instead to be an educator in Yorkshire and the south of England. While living in Brighton and Lewes in the 1850s, he became a minister.

Tylor compiled and edited memoirs of deceased Friends. He edited and enlarged and published Edward Backhouse's Early Church History and its sequel Witnesses for Christ, after Backhouse's death: both books went through several editions.

Tylor and his wife Gulielma Maria Sparkes, born in Petrock Parish, Exeter, Devon, on 29 July 1823, daughter of Joseph Sparkes and wife Sarah ..., whom he married in London, Middlesex, in March 1848, had seven children. Their eldest daughter, Mary (1849–1887), married George Cadbury (1839–1922), the chocolatier, on 14 March 1872. Catherine (1850–1930), their second child, married Alfred Bastin (1847–1917) on 21 March 1872 and Elizabeth (1852–1928), their fourth child, married 1879 Richard Hingston Fox (1853–1924) a descendant of Joseph Fox of Falmouth, founder of the medical dynasty of the Fox family. Their other children, in birth order, are Joseph Sparkes Tylor (1851–1922), Rachel Savory Tylor (1855–1937), Gulielma Tylor (1857–1935), and Theodore Tylor (1866–1887).

Tylor died in Brighton, Sussex, England, aged 85.

== Publications ==
Books and articles written or edited by Charles Tylor (Many of these are available at the Library at Friends House, London):

=== Early church history ===
- Early church history : to the death of Constantine / compiled by the late Edward Backhouse; edited and enlarged by Charles Tylor. - ill., map, port.. - (1884) p.xxii, 553 p., [29] leaves of plates. - London : Hamilton, Adams & Co.
- 2nd edition, 1885: with an appendix containing "The teaching of the twelve Apostles". - ill., port.. - (1885) p.xviii, 587 p., [30] leaves of plates. - 2nd ed.. - London : Hamilton, Adams & Co., 1885. - xviii, 587 p., [30] leaves of plates : ill., port.; 23 cm.
- 3rd edition, 1892: with a biographical sketch by Dr. Hodgkin. - ill., port.. - (1892) p.xviii, 333 p., [18] leaves of plates. - 3rd ed.. - London : Simpkin, Marshall, Hamilton, Kent & Co., 1892. - xviii, 333 p., [18] leaves of plates : ill., port.; 23 cm.
- 4th edition, 1899 London : Headley Brothers
- 5th edition, 1901 London : Headley Brothers
- 6th edition, 1906 London : Headley Brothers

=== Witnesses for Christ ===
- Witnesses for Christ : and memorials of church life from the fourth to the thirteenth century : a sequel to "Early church history" : in two volumes / by Edward Backhouse and Charles Tylor. - ill.. - (1887) p. 2 v.. - London : Hamilton, Adams & Co.
- 2nd edition, 1894 revised and somewhat abridged: - London : Simpkin, Marshall, Hamilton, Kent & Co.
- 3rd edition, 1899 - London : Headley Brothers

=== Other books ===
- A Historical Tour in Franconia, in the Summer of 1852; (1852) Brighton; Robert Folthorp
- Memoir and diary of John Yeardley, minister of the gospel / ed. by Charles Tylor. - (1859) p.viii, 456 p.. - London : Alfred W Bennett and Philadelphia : Henry Longstreth
- Memoirs of Elizabeth Dudley : consisting chiefly of selections from her Journal and correspondence : interspersed with extracts from the diary and letters of her sister, Charlotte Dudley / edited by Charles Tylor. - (1861) p.viii, 336 p.. - London : Alfred W Bennett
- The life and labours of George Washington Walker, of Hobart Town, Tasmania / By James Backhouse and Charles Tylor. - ill., ports.. - (1862) p.xii, 556, 12 p.. - London : Alfred W Bennett
- The Huguenots in the Seventeenth Century, including the history of the Edict of Nantes, from its enactment in 1598 to its revocation in 1685; Simpkin, Marshall, Hamilton, Kent, 1892
- The Camisards : a sequel to "The Huguenots in the seventeenth century" / by Charles Tylor. - ill., maps, port.. - (1893) p.xv, 460 p.. - London : Edward Hicks, jun.; Simpkin, Marshall, Hamilton, Kent & Co. Note: Includes an Appendix: The Quakers of Congenies
- Tares and Wheat: A Memorial of John Wycliffe; London: Headley Bros. (1897)
- The Story of William Tyndale; London : Headley Brothers, (1898)
- Samuel Tuke : his life, work, and thoughts / edited by Charles Tylor. - ill., ports.. - (1900) p. 283 p.. - London : Headley Brothers

=== Illustrated books for children ===
- Pictures of church history, in pen and pencil from the close of the New Testament to the death of Bede / by Charles Tylor and Gordon Hargrave. - ill., ports. - (1901) p.xi, 292 p., [26] leaves of plates. - London : S. W. Partridge
- Round the hearth : a selection of true stories told in easy words; with some original verses / By Charles Tylor and Gordon Hargrave. With seventeen original illustrations. - 17 ill.. - (1899) p.vi, [ii], 179 p.. - London : Headley Brothers

=== Tracts ===
- The Worship of the New Covenant. London; F Bower Kitto (1869), 16 p, 18 cm
- The faggot [temperance stories]: gathered and made up / by Charles Tylor. - (1876) p.viii, 248 p..- London : Samuel Harris & Co.
- War : a letter to a Friend on a paper by Herbert Hutchinson, read at our Quarterly Meeting last month, and entitled, "War, with special reference to the Sermon on the Mount, and the teaching of Plato" / [signed] Charles Tylor. - (1901?]) p.[3] p.. - Brighton : s.n.

=== Articles in Quaker journals ===
- The Old Testament as seen from the New / Charles Tylor. - In: Friends' quarterly examiner; Vol.24; no.93 (First Month 1890) p. 40-49 [later reprinted by the Friends Tract Association]
- A month on the track of the Huguenots under Louis XIV and XV in the Vivarais, Languedoc, and the Cevennes / Charles Tylor. - In: Friends' quarterly examiner; Vol.25; no.99 (Seventh Mo. 1891) p. 337-367 and Vol.25; no.100 (Tenth Month 1891) p. 489-518
- Leaves from the diary of a tour in France in May and June, 1893 / Charles Tylor. - In: Friends' quarterly examiner; Vol.27; no.107 (Seventh Mo. 1893) p. 433-447
- The books of the people. Mediaeval wall paintings in the churches of Sussex and Surrey / Charles Tylor. - In: Friends' quarterly examiner; Vol.29; no.113 (First Month 1895) p. 81-97
- Count Campello / Charles Tylor. - In: Friends' quarterly examiner; Vol.29; no.116 (Tenth Month 1895) p. 491-506 * Gospel light in Italy / Charles Tylor. - In: Friends' quarterly examiner; Vol.30; no.117 (First Month 1896) p. 111-124
- The renaissance in Italy / Charles Tylor. - In: Friends' quarterly examiner; Vol.32; no.128 (Tenth Month 1898) p. 427-441
- Schooldays in the twenties. A reminiscence for my grandchildren / by Charles Tylor. - In: The Journal of the Friends Historical Society; Vol.17; no.1 (1920) p. 1-19
