= Jane Catharine Tost =

Australian taxidermist (1817–1889)

- Born: 1817; London
- Died: 24 April 1889 (aged 71–72); Sydney
- Occupation: Taxidermist

Jane Catharine Tost (1817-1889) was an Australian taxidermist.

Tost and her siblings learned taxidermy from their parents, John and Catherine Ward. John Ward was a bird breeder and naturalist. Tost was employed at British Museum in the 1840s and 1850s before emigrating to Australia.

In 1839, Tost married Charles Gottleibe Tost, a Prussian-born pianoforte maker at St Anne's Church, Westminster.

The family emigrated to Tasmania in 1856, arriving on the Indian Queen from Liverpool and on 22 January with their six children. She was soon employed stuffing and mounting specimens for the Royal Society of Tasmania at the Hobart Town Museum in 1856-60, and had the same position at the Australian Museum in Sydney in 1864-69. This position was unusual for her gender and she was a pioneer as such. She resigned her position at The Australian Museum after a falling out between her husband and curator, Gerard Krefft in 1869.

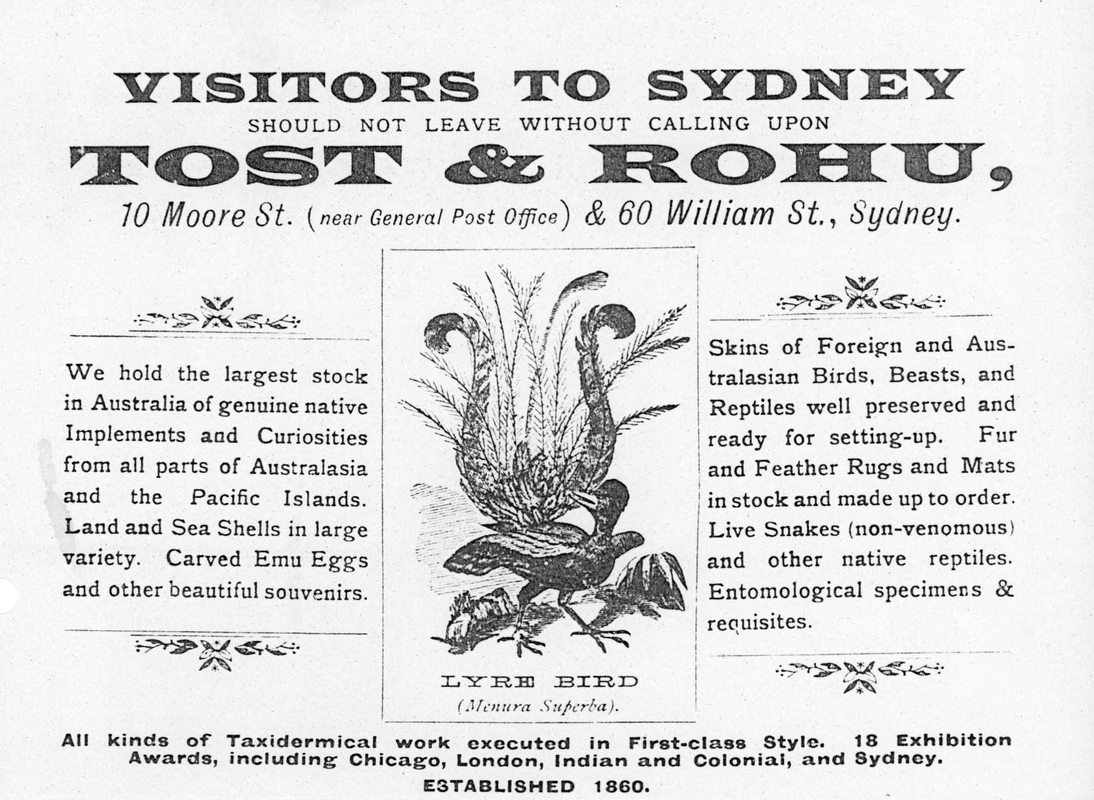
Advertisement for Tost & Rohu, Taxidermists, Tanners and Island Curio Dealers, Sydney.

From 1872 onward, she managed the Tost & Coates Berlin Wool Depot and Taxidermists, at 60 William Street, Sydney with her daughter Ada Jane Rohu (1848-1928). From 1860, mother and daughter participated in international exhibitions and won many prizes. The pair provided instruction in taxidermy, as well as selling and supplying an eclectic mix of furs, Aboriginal and Islander artefacts, and stuffed animals to collecting institutions and their shop customers.

When Ada married in 1878 the firm became Tost & Rohu.

Tost died 24 April 1889, and is buried in the Church of England section at Rookwood Cemetery.

== Sources ==
- Australian Dictionary of Biography
