= Mary Capper =

Quaker writer and minister (1755–1845)

- Born: 11 April 1755; Rugeley Staffordshire
- Died: 23 May 1835 (aged 80); Birmingham
- Known for: Travelling minister
- Religion: Society of Friends

Mary Capper (11 April 1755-23 May 1845) was a Quaker writer associated with the West Midlands who ministered to congregations of the Society of Friends across England. Her role was unusual at a time when men dominated religious leadership in England.

She was born in Rugeley, Staffordshire in 1755, she had nine siblings. Though Staffordshire had a Quaker presence from the late 17th-century onwards, Capper was born into an Anglican family. She started to attend Quaker meetings in London with her brother Jasper from 1776 and became a member around 1785. Another brother, William, also became a Quaker. After 1783 her letters show that she had switched to using the Quaker calendar, for example dating her correspondence to the second day of the third month, rather than using calendar names associated with pagan worship such as the moon and Mars. Her parents strongly disapproved of Mary and her brothers leaving the Church of England.. She was reconciled to her mother, Rebecca Capper, after her father's death in April 1785. She cared for Rebecca Capper until her mother's death in 1793.

Mary Capper has been referred to as a Quaker minister. Quakers do not have a formal priesthood or ministry, however it was accepted that an individual can be called by divine inspiration, as a vocation, to minister to a meeting, or more widely. The Society of Friends' structure is devolved to local meetings, and some Quaker meetings, or assembly of elders, wrote letters of recommendation to endorse an individual's abilities to minister in other locations. From 1794, a year after her mother's death, Capper used her letter of recommendation to travel by foot, on horseback and stagecoach to minister to Quakers in different parts of England. She visited prisons to provide chaplaincy to prisoners.

Between 1794 and 1813 her travelling ministry was often done in conjunction with Mary Beesley, a Quaker preacher. After Beesley's death she either worked alone or with another travel companion, Hannah Evans. This continued until 1825, when she appears to have retired at the age of 70. She never married, putting her religious work above other considerations.

Capper was one of the women in the Quaker movement who voiced opposition to the process of evangelisation, which from 1800 became a significant movement, and from which Quakers were not exempt, particularly through the Men's Yearly Meeting. In Quaker terms evangelisation promoted biblical scripture to a greater extent than more traditional Quaker propositions, which emphasised the role of divine grace, or inner light. In 1815 Capper wrote that she feared the loss of the "relish of simplicity" and the silent waiting for the light.

Capper lived in a number of places in England, including London, Birmingham and Leominster, and travelled to Quaker meetings around the country. In 1816 she returned to live in Birmingham, while still travelling to meetings. She died in Birmingham in 1845 at the age of 90 years.

== Legacy ==
After she died, a testimony was written by the Warwickshire North monthly meeting of Quakers: "The natural cheerfulness of her disposition, and her uniform kindness and courtesy, endeared her to all who were acquainted with her, and rendered her society both pleasant and instructive. She was firmly attached to the principles of our religious Society, believing them to be in full accordance with the New Testament, but largely cherished Christian love and charity to all those who conscientiously differed from her."

She was a prolix letter writer, and was in correspondence with other notable Quakers of the day, including Richard Tapper Cadbury, his wife Elizabeth, other members of the Cadbury family, prison campaigner Elizabeth Fry and Mary Morris Knowles. Knowles came from Capper's home town of Rugeley and was Capper's mentor from 1776. Much of this correspondence and her journals have been preserved and printed in book form. Many of her Quaker friends, including Knowles, were campaigning for the end of slavery, which was partly achieved in 1807 when Parliament passed the Slave Trade Act, though her journals and letters make little reference to the Abolitionist movement. She was in regular correspondence with Katharine Backhouse, a Darlington Quaker married to the philanthropist Edward Backhouse, and she edited her memoirs after Capper's death. It was first published in 1847 and in an abridged format in 1860. Some of her other papers are held by the Birmingham Archives and Collections.

== See also ==
- Quaker missionaries
