= Jane Fletcher =

Jane Fletcher may refer to:

- Jane Fletcher (Australian writer) (1870–1956), Tasmanian poet and author
- Jane Fletcher (English writer) (born 1956), English writer of lesbian speculative fiction
