= Robert Yardley =

Robert Yardley may refer to:

- Robert Blake Yardley (1858–1943), British barrister and philatelist
- Robert M. Yardley (1850–1902), American politician from Pennsylvania
