= Ada Jane Rohu =

Australian taxidermist and businesswoman (1848–1928)

Ada Rohu
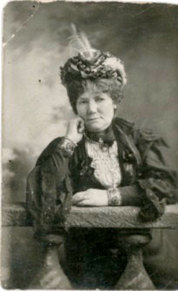
- Born: 16 March 1848; London
- Died: 28 July 1928 (aged 80); Newtown, NSW
- Occupation: Taxidermist

Ada Rohu (1848 – 1928), full name Jane Catherine Rohu, was a pioneering Australian taxidermist and businesswoman.

== Biography ==
=== Early life ===
Ada Jane Rohu was born on 16 March 1848 in London. Her parents were Jane Catharine Tost, an English taxidermist and museum worker, and Charles Gottleibe Tost, a Prussian pianoforte-maker. The family migrated from England to Tasmania when Ada was seven years old, arriving in Hobart Town in January 1856. In 1860 they moved to Sydney, where Jane Tost worked as a taxidermist at the Australian Museum.

=== Career ===
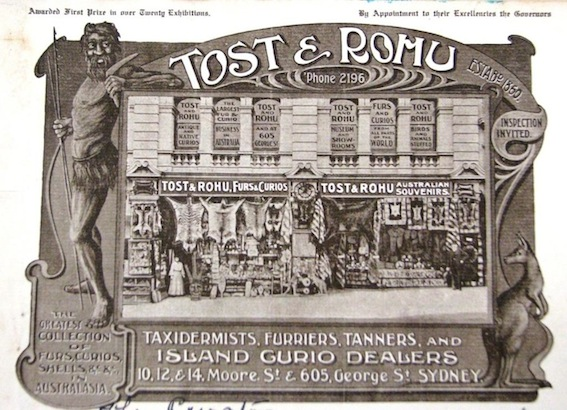
Tost & Rohu, Sydney, shop.

As a young woman Rohu acted at the Queen Victoria Theatre in Sydney. She married James Richardson Coates in 1868 and they had three children. After James' death in 1872 Ada and her mother Jane opened a taxidermy shop, Tost & Coates (later Tost & Rohu), at 60 William Street, Sydney. Their customers included museums and scientific collectors as well as middle-class households shopping for interior decor. Known as "the queerest shop in Australia", their business supplied the Australian Museum with many important specimens.

In 1891, Rohu helped to prepare the Australian exhibit for the Chicago World's Fair.

Rohu and her mother exhibited their taxidermy work at many international exhibitions, and between 1860 and 1900 won more than 20 medals. Their work was valued for its skill and for its innovative treatment of Australian fauna. One known example of Ada Rohu's taxidermy work survives: a squirrel held by the Australian Museum.

=== Marriage and children ===
Rohu married James Richardson Coates on 8 October 1868 in Woolloomooloo, Sydney. They had three children. James Coates died fighting a fire at the Prince of Wales Theatre, Sydney, in 1872.

On 12 September 1878 she married Henry Steward Boventure Rohu, with whom she had six children.

=== Death and afterward ===
Ada Jane Rohu died on 28 July 1928 at Newtown and was buried in Rookwood Cemetery.
