= Jardi =

Jardi may refer to:

- Jir Deh, Rudsar, a village in Iran
- Andrea Jardi (born 1990), Spanish skier

== See also ==
- Jardee
