= Henry Hodgkin =

British Quaker missionary and medical doctor (1877–1933)

Henry Theodore Hodgkin
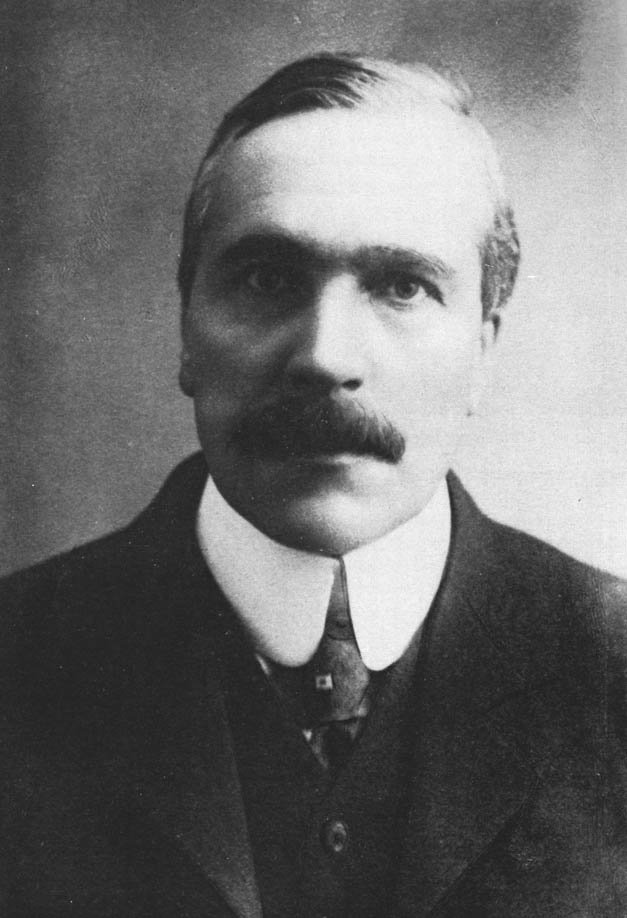
- Born: 21 April 1877; Darlington, Durham, England
- Died: 26 March 1933 (aged 55); Dublin, Ireland
- Education: King's College, Cambridge; St Thomas' Hospital
- Occupations: Missionary, physician
- Spouse: Elizabeth Joy Montgomery
- Parents: Jonathan Backhouse Hodgkin (father); Mary Anna Pease (mother)
- Family: Hodgkin family

Henry Theodore Hodgkin (H. T. Hodgkin; 21 April 1877 – 26 March 1933) was a medical doctor and a British Quaker missionary who, in the course of his 55-year life, co-founded the West China Union University in Chengdu, co-founded and led the first Christian pacifist movement, the International Fellowship of Reconciliation, and founded the Pendle Hill Quaker meeting and training center, in Wallingford, Pennsylvania.

== Life ==
=== Early years ===
Henry Theodore Hodgkin was born on 21 April 1877 in a very affluent Quaker family of Darlington in County Durham, North East England. He was the son of Jonathan Backhouse Hodgkin (1843-1926), banker and mayor of Darlington, and of Mary Anna Pease, both from Quaker families. The Hodgkins lived in the majestic Victorian manor of Elm Ridge in Darlington.

After Leighton Park School he studied first in King's College, Cambridge, then in St Thomas' Hospital, London, to become a medical doctor (M.B. B.Ch [Cantab]). Extremely tall, with exceptional charisma and personality, he became President of the English Student Missionary Union from 1902 to 1905. This organization's aim was to recruit missionaries among British students.

=== Missionary work in China ===
After completing his studies in 1905, Henry Hodgkin left immediately for Chengdu, in the Sichuan province, China, as a missionary of the Friends' Foreign Mission Association, a Quaker organisation which later became the Friends Service Council; he stayed in China until 1909. During his stay in Chengdu, he succeeded Omar Leslie Kilborn as editor of The West China Missionary News in May 1909, a position he held until January 1910. He helped set up the West China Union University, a Protestant university sponsored by several Protestant churches until its closure in 1926; after 1926 the Chinese professors took over from the foreign professors, and perpetuated their work so well that this university has now been incorporated into Chengdu's various universities.

From 1910 to 1920, Henry Hodgkin returned to England, to be the Secretary of The Friends' Foreign Missionary Association. He departed again for China in 1921, initially to deliver a series of lectures. He received however as a result a pressing invitation to become one of the secretaries of the National Christian Council of China; he held this position from 1922 to 1929.

=== Launching of the International Fellowship of Reconciliation ===
During his decade in Britain from 1910 to 1920, Hodgkin became active on the pacifist scene. In the summer of 1914, he had joined a group of about 150 European Christians who were convinced that a major conflagration was coming soon in Europe and who had gathered in Constance, in southern Germany, to envisage possible actions to avert an actual war. This conference was far from successful since it was interrupted by the actual declaration of war! While conference participants were hurriedly returning home by train, Henry Hodgkin and the German Lutheran pastor Friedrich Siegmund-Schultze made a mutual commitment before parting in Cologne that while their countries might be at war with each other, "We are one in Christ and can never be at war." This commitment implied of course to abstain from any direct personal participation in the conflict, in line with the traditional pacifist Quaker position, but also to work relentlessly to reestablish peace between their two nations no matter the policies of their governments. Hodgkin kept his word immediately and initiated a first meeting at Queens' College, Cambridge, where he lectured in philosophy: an ecumenical group of about 20 people came together to reflect on the implications of war on their personal and community life. They wrote a common declaration stating they could conceive God as a nationalist and couldn't accept the idea of a moratorium on the Sermon on the Mount on hold for the duration of the war. The first chapter of the Fellowship of Reconciliation (FOR) was born. Another meeting gathered 128 people at Trinity College, Cambridge, where Henry Hodgkin was elected president of the FOR. In 1915 Hodgkin travelled to New York City with a group of 66 people and convened a meeting at Union Theological Seminary that included some very influential theologians and ministers the day, including Reinhold Niebuhr (who would become critical of Christian pacifism in the ’30s and consequently break with the FOR). Among those present that day were Edward Evans, Norman Thomas, socialist educator Jessie Wallace Hughan (who would later found the more secular War Resisters League), Episcopalian bishop Paul Jones (who would be forced to resign his Utah see in April 1918 because of his outspoken opposition to World War I), Grace Hutchins et John Haynes Holmes. The American chapter of the now International Fellowship of Reconciliation was then founded.

=== Work in the United States ===
In 1929 Henry Hodgkin was called to launch the Quaker religious and social meeting centre of Pendle Hill near Philadelphia (Pendle Hill being the name of the Lancashire hill where George Fox, the inspirator of Quakerism, had his founding vision). Historian Douglas Gwyn has shown Henry Hodgkin’s determining role, contributing his spiritual depth and his social concern to the drafting of the meeting centre’s vision: Pendle Hill’s early vision was to be "a vital center of spiritual culture and as a place for training leaders." In 1929, Henry Hodgkin gathered a dozen leaders to discern the direction for this new center and four key focus areas were chosen as a result:

- House of Rest, a place of peace and deep quiet;
- School of the Prophets, a place to be grounded in a few well-chosen areas rather than teaching on many interesting topics;
- Laboratory of Ideas, a place to test beliefs in practice; and
- Fellowship ’Round Christ among students and staff.

He had to leave this position in 1932 for health reasons.

== Books ==
Henry Hodgkin wrote several books, among which are:

- The Message and Mission of Quakerism (1912) (with William Charles Braithwaite [1862–1922])
- Friends beyond the Seas (1916)
- Lay religion (New York, 1919)
- The Missionary Spirit - Swarthmore Lecture for 1916
- The Christian Revolution (1923)
- Living Issues in China (1932)

== Philosophy ==
Hodgkin's philosophy was rooted in his Quaker faith, which brought along a deep adhesion to pacifism and in a high social sensitivity. His views evolved from a strict English Quaker missionary’s view to a more multicultural approach. One of his biographers wrote that he was "a man large of body and mind". He summarised his own evolution as follows: "By processes too numerous and diverse even to summarize, I have reached a position which may be stated in a general way somewhat like this: "I believe that God's best for another may be so different from my experience and way of living as to be actually impossible for me. I recognize a change to have taken place in myself, from a certain assumption that mine was really the better way, to a very complete recognition that there is no one better way and that God needs all kinds of people and ways of living through which to manifest Himself in the World. This has seemed to carry with it two conclusions which greatly affect conduct. One is that I really find myself wanting to learn from people whom I previously would have regarded as fit objects for my 'missionary zeal'. To discover another way in which God is operating - along lines it may be distasteful or dangerous to me - is a large part of the fun of living. The second direction in which conduct is influenced is the deliberate attempt to share the life and interests of others who are not in my circle ... [for] in such sharing I can most deeply understand the other's life and through that reach, maybe, fresh truths about God."

== Family ==
Henry Hodgkin married Elizabeth Joy Montgomery. They had three children. He died on 26 March 1933 in Dublin a few weeks after undergoing surgery. His family counted a variety of personalities who deeply influenced the region of Darlington:

- As a banker, his father had financed a fair share of the region's industrial development.
- His father-in-law, John Pease was the oldest son of railway pioneer Edward Pease, and another affluent Quaker industrialist who had the Elm Ridge manor built.
- His brother Jonathan Edward Hodgkin (1875-1953) was a devoted humanitarian during World War I, heading the local branch of The Friends War Victims Relief Committee - FWVRC. From 1916 on he served in Durham as a Quaker chaplain to the imprisoned conscientious objectors and organised transport for wounded in Darlington district. He also became treasurer of the London Peace Society.
- His sister Mary Hodgkin (1882-1956) was the secretary of Darlington Town Mission for many years. She raised the needed money to build the Chapel at the Darlington Memorial Hospital for the use of the patients.

== See also ==
- Quakerism in Sichuan
- H. T. Silcock – Quaker missionary to Sichuan
