= Yardie (disambiguation) =

Yardie is a term used in specific contexts for people of Jamaican origin.

Yardie may also refer to:

- Yardie (film), a 2018 British film
- Yardie (novel), a 1992 novel by Victor Headly
- a yard of ale

Yardi may refer to:

- Ashvini Yardi, producer of Bollywood films
- Sachin Yardi, Hindi film director

== See also ==
- Yardy, a surname (including a list of people with the name)
- Jardi (disambiguation)
