= James Backhouse Walker =

Australian solicitor and historian (1841–1899)

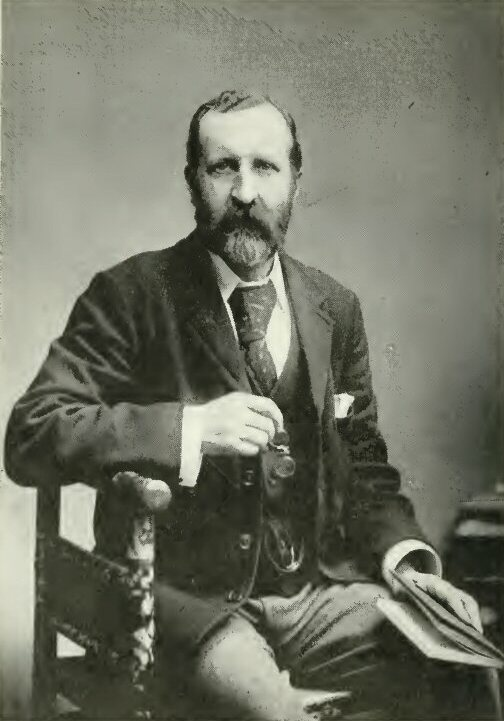
J. B. Walker

James Backhouse Walker, FRGS (14 October 1841 – 4 November 1899) was an Australian solicitor and historian.

== Life ==
James Backhouse Walker was born at Hobart on 14 October 1841, the eldest son of the Quaker missionary George Washington Walker. His mother, Sarah Walker née Benson, was the daughter of an English emigrant named Robert Mather. Walker was educated at the High School, Hobart, and the Quaker Bootham School, York.

He first entered the workforce as a junior clerk, working first for Thomas Chapman's importing and exporting firm, and then for his father’s Hobart Savings Bank. He began training as a lawyer in 1872, and was admitted as barrister, solicitor and proctor of the Supreme Court of Tasmania in 1876. He became a senior partner in his eponymous firm, J. B. Walker and Wolfhagen.

The Australian Dictionary of Biography describes Walker as "socially committed" and holding "advanced liberal views". He contributed substantially to the collection of the Tasmanian Public Library, where he was a trustee. He was elected to the council of the Royal Society of Tasmania in 1888. He also served on the Tasmanian Board of Education, and in 1889 he proposed founding a university, which eventually became the University of Tasmania. He served on the university's first council in 1890, and was its second vice-chancellor, appointed in 1898. He supported the Hobart Working Men's Club, which sought improved conditions for workers, though in his later years he had a negative view of Australian Trade Unions. He was a Quaker, and taught Sunday school at the Davey Street Congregational Church.

Walker never married, and died at his home on 4 November 1899. His estate at his death was worth £1106 (equivalent to £157,258 in 2023).

== History of Tasmania ==
Walker was the author of several brochures on the history of his native colony, taken chiefly from official sources: viz. "The French in Van Diemen's Land" (Hobart, 1889); "The Settlement of Tasmania, comprising Papers read before the Royal Society of Tasmania" (Hobart, 1890); "The Discovery and Occupation of Port Dalrymple" (Hobart, 1890). His papers on the discovery, early settlement and Aboriginal inhabitants of Tasmania were collected and published posthumously in 1902 as Early Tasmania: Papers Read Before the Royal Society of Tasmania Between 1888 and 1899. The book became a standard historical reference for the period, and was reprinted in 1914.

The Law School of the University of Tasmania commemorates him with the J. B. Walker Memorial Prize.

=== Walk to the West ===
In 1887, Walker walked from Hobart to the West Coast of Tasmania, accompanied by Arthur Leslie Giblin, Charles Percy Sprent, William Piguenit, Robert Mackenzie Johnston, William Vincent Legge, George Samuel Perrin, and Henry Vincent Bayly. The trip began on 17 February 1887 (Hobart to New Norfolk by train, then to Ouse by coach), and concluded 5 March 1887 (Formby (Devonport) by coach to Launceston, then by train to Hobart). He kept a diary of the journey, which has served as a record of Tasmania's early history.

In 1993, the Royal Society of Tasmania published a high-quality edition to celebrate the Society's sesquicentenary (150 years). D. M. Stoddard transcribed Walker's manuscript diary and edited the book. The publication was partly funded through donations from academic societies and government grants. It was released on December 24, 1993. The book was produced entirely in Tasmania, and won two awards from the Printing Industry of the Carolinas. The book is interspersed with plates from Piguenit's paintings made during the journey. Locations with paintings include: Lake Pedder, Frenchman's Cap, Mount King William, Lake St Clair, Mount Rufus, Mount Gell, King William Range, Mount Ida, Mount Heemskirk, and Mount Olympus. It also contains a foldout map of the West Coast at the time of the group's travel. The included Lexicon of relevant place names identifies characters involved in the exploration, track cutting, and place naming in the West Coast of Tasmania.
