= H. T. Silcock =

English Quaker missionary

Harry Thomas Silcock
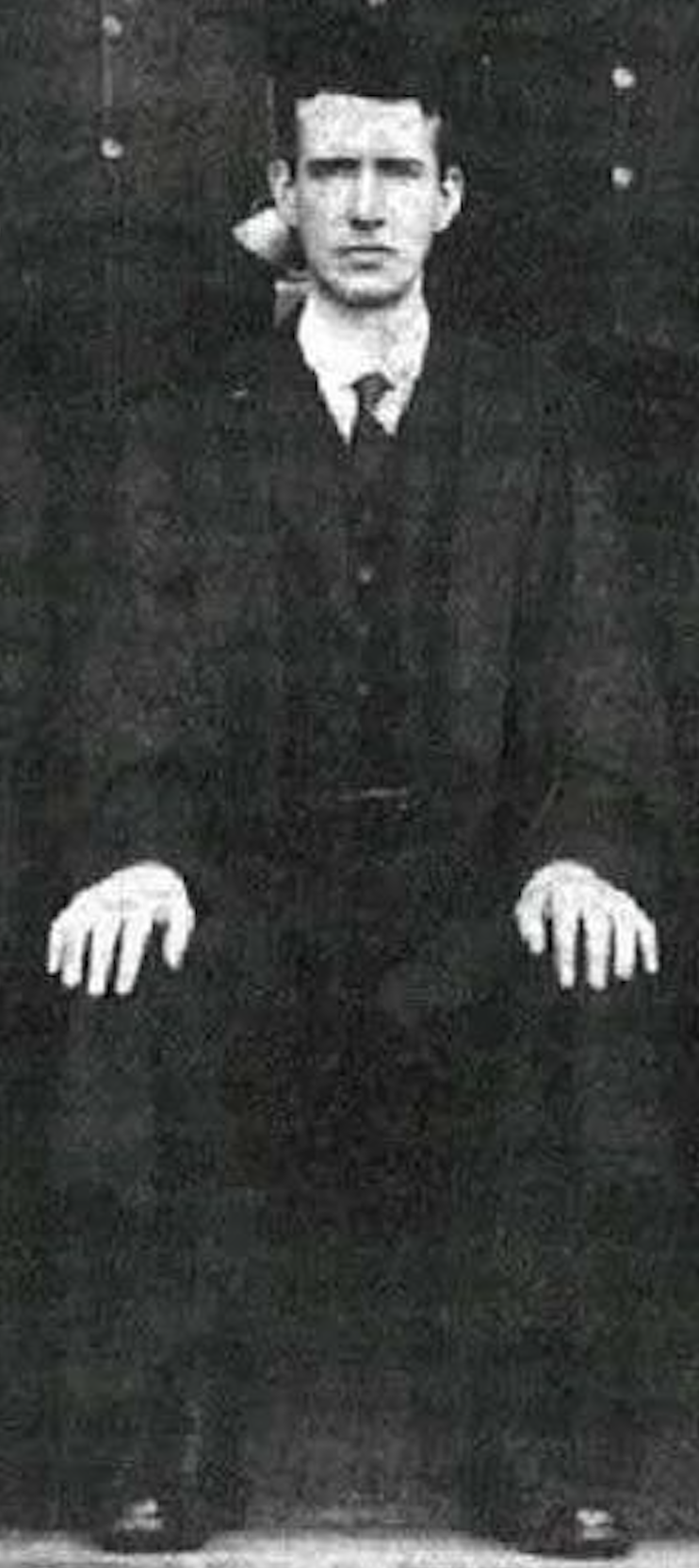
- H. T. Silcock when serving as vice president of the West China Union University, 1917.

Personal life
- Born: 1882 Bath, Somerset, England
- Died: 1969 (aged 86–87)
- Spouse: Margaret Silcock (m. 1909)
- Children: Thomas Henry Silcock and four others
- Education: Bath College; Fettes College; Oriel College, Oxford
- Known for: Being vice president of the West China Union University
- Other name: Henry Thomas Silcock
- Occupation: Missionary, university president

Religious life
- Religion: Quaker
- Denomination: Britain Yearly Meeting

Henry Thomas Silcock (1882–1969) was an English missionary of the Religious Society of Friends (Quaker), who served as vice president of the West China Union University during its initial years.

== Life and career ==
Silcock was born in 1882 in Bath, Somerset. He was educated at Bath College, Fettes College, Edinburgh, and Oriel College, Oxford. He travelled to China as a missionary and teacher through the Friends' Foreign Mission Association (FFMA) in 1908 and married Margaret Standing in Chengdu (Chengtu, Sichuan) the next year, with whom he had five children.

He was a member of the Temporary Board of Management of the West China Union University, together with Joseph Beech, Canright, C. R. Carscallen, E. J. Carson, H. T. Hodgkin, H. D. Robertson, J. Taylor, E. Williams, and J. W. Yost. He began to work at the Union University in 1911, one year after its establishment, and was appointed as vice president. During this time, he and his wife became active members in social and academic circles.

In 1919, Silcock returned to England with his wife. Silcock took over the secretariat of the FFMA, a position he held until 1932, when he became secretary of the Universities' China Committee in London. It is during this time that he was also involved in the China Society. In 1938, he went back to China and encouraged the formation of a Friends Centre in Shanghai in 1939. In the following decade he made extensive travels around the world for the Friends World Committee for Consultation (FWCC), and returned to Chengdu in 1947. Between 1950 and 1954, he resumed his work for the FWCC and was made an Honorary Member in 1961. He died in 1969, aged 86.

== Published works ==
- Silcock, H. T.; Silcock, M. (1912). Studies in the Personality of Christ. London: Student Christian Movement. 71 pp.
- Silcock, H. T. (1927). Christ and the World's Unrest. London: The Swarthmore Press. 63 pp.
- Silcock, H. T. (February 1927). Swanwick, H. M. (ed.). "Are Missions Mischievous?". Foreign Affairs: A Journal of International Understanding. 3 (1): 204–205.

== See also ==
- Stephen Yang
- Britain Yearly Meeting
- Quakerism in Sichuan
- Quaker missionaries
