= Royal Society of Tasmania =

Scientific society in Tasmania, Australia

- Formation: 14 October 1843
- Type: Statutory corporation
- Headquarters: Hobart, Tasmania, Australia
- Website: rst.org.au
- Formerly called: Botanical and Horticultural Society of Van Diemen's Land

The Royal Society of Tasmania (RST) was formed in 1843. It was the first Royal Society outside the United Kingdom, and its mission was the advancement of knowledge.

The work of the Royal Society of Tasmania includes:

- Promoting Tasmanian historical, scientific and technological knowledge for the benefit of Tasmanians,
- Fostering Tasmanian public engagement and participation in the quest for objective knowledge,
- Recognising excellence in academia and supporting Tasmanian academic excellence, and
- Providing objective advice for policy relating to Tasmanian issues.

The Patron of the Society is Her Excellency, Professor, the Honourable Kate Warner AM, Governor of Tasmania.

== History ==
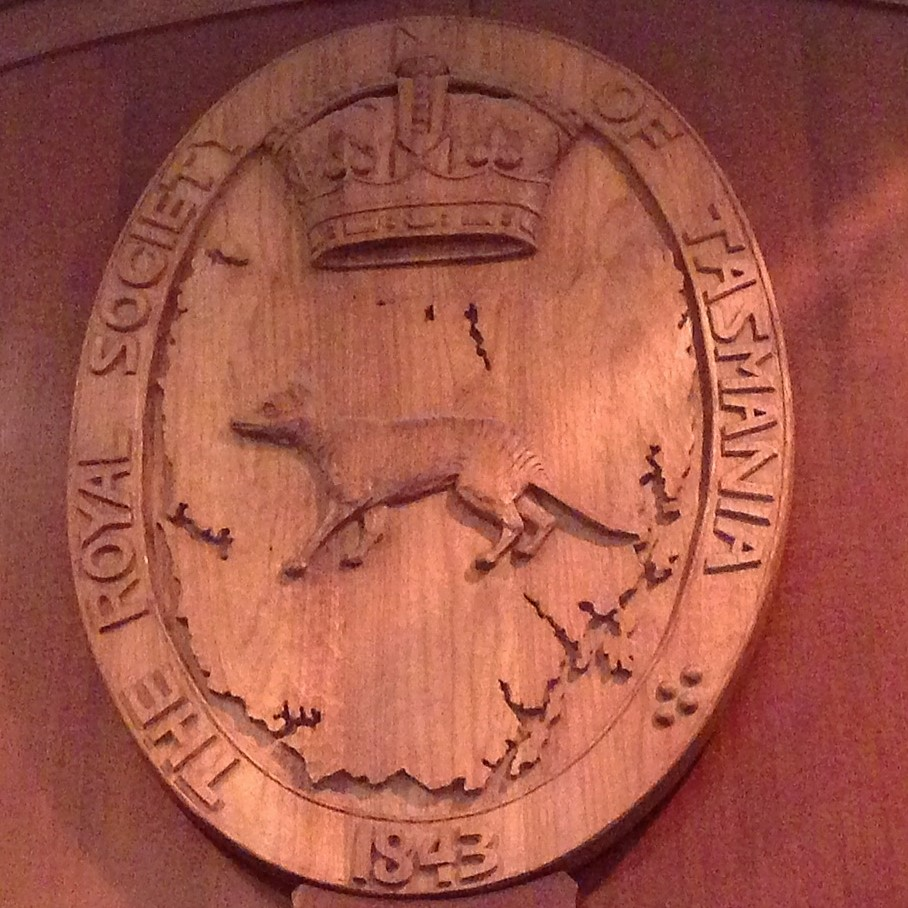
The Royal Society of Tasmania coat of arms carved by Nellie Payne in 1930

The Society was founded on 14 October 1843 at a meeting convened by Sir John Eardley-Wilmot, Lieutenant Governor, as the Botanical and Horticultural Society of Van Diemen’s Land. Its original aim was to ‘develop the physical character of the Island and illustrate its natural history and productions’. Established under its own Act, passed by the Tasmanian Parliament, the Society is permitted to create its own by-laws.

In its early years, the Society was responsible for much of the work in founding the Royal Tasmanian Botanical Gardens, and also began building up substantial collections of both art and natural history specimens, all housed in The Royal Society of Tasmania Museum. These collections became the basis of the Tasmanian Museum and Art Gallery in 1885, when the Society gave them to the Government.

The Society also built up a substantial Library. In September 1930, a new library was opened which held more than 20,000 books and pamphlets. The society’s coat of arms, carved in wood by local artist Nellie Payne was presented at this time.

A branch of the Society was formed in Launceston in 1853. It lapsed but was reconstituted in 1921 and has continued since then.

In 1934, the ornithologist Jane Ada Fletcher became the first woman to give a lecture before other members.

== The Tasmanian Society of Natural History ==
Drawing its inspiration from the illustrious original Royal Society founded in London in 1660, the Royal Society of Tasmania is the oldest royal society outside the United Kingdom, having had a continuing existence since 1843. Earlier bodies include the 1837 formation of the Tasmanian Society of Natural History by Sir John Franklin assisted by Ronald Campbell Gunn.

Queen Victoria became Patron of the Botanical and Horticultural Society of Van Diemen’s Land in 1844 and the name was changed to The Royal Society of Van Diemen’s Land for Horticulture, Botany and the Advancement of Science. Under the current Act of Parliament, passed in 1911, the name was shortened to The Royal Society of Tasmania.

== Anniversaries ==
On the event of the sesquicentenary of the Society in 1993 it produced the volume Walk to the West to publish James Backhouse Walker's diary of a walk in 1887, including William Piguenit's paintings from that journey.

The text from a plaque to celebrate the 175th anniversary is found in the Monument Australia online record.

== Membership and activities ==
In 2017, the Society's membership numbered about 350 from throughout Tasmania and beyond, meeting in Hobart and Launceston. The Society is administered by a Council comprising elected and ex-officio members. The membership of the Royal Society of Tasmania is open to all. The priorities of the Society are addressed through lecture programmes, panel discussions, symposia, excursions, publications including the peer-reviewed annual journal Papers and Proceedings of the Royal Society of Tasmania, and a library. Eminent scholars are recognised through various awards and bursaries.

The Society is currently based in the Tasmanian Museum and Art Gallery, Hobart. The Society’s library collection is housed within the University of Tasmania's Morris Miller Library, on the Sandy Bay Campus of the University in Hobart.

The Northern Chapter is based at the Queen Victoria Museum and Art Gallery in Launceston.

== Truganini ==
Prior to her death, Truganini had pleaded to colonial authorities for a respectful burial, and requested that her ashes be scattered in the D'Entrecasteaux Channel. She feared that her body would be dissected and analyzed for scientific purposes as Aboriginal Tasmanian Wiliam Lenne's body had been. Despite her wishes, within two years, her skeleton was exhumed by the members of the Royal Society of Tasmania and later placed on display.
