= Maud H. Yardley =

British writer

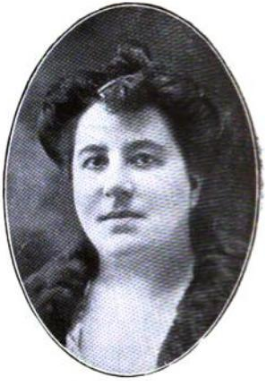
- Maud H. Yardley, from a 1906 publication.
- Born: 6 March 1867; London, England
- Died: 1 May 1954 (aged 87); Evesham, Worcestershire, England
- Other names: Maud Hogarth Croft, Maude Mannering
- Occupation: Writer
- Notable work: Sinless (novel, 1906)
- Spouse: William Yardley

Maud Hogarth Yardley (6 March 1867 – 1 May 1954) was a British writer.

== Personal life ==
Maud H. Croft (or Mannering) was born in London in 1867, the daughter of Montague Mannering and Esther Croft. She married British writer, drama critic and former cricketer William Yardley, in New York in 1886, and they had four children. She was widowed when William Yardley died in 1900, and she died in 1954, aged 87 years, in Evesham, Worcestershire.

== Career ==
Yardley was a widow with young children when she became a published author. Her first novel, Sinless (1906), was described as a "foggy romance" of mistaken identities. It was followed with an "engrossing" and "tragic" novel, Nor All Your Tears (1908). She also wrote short stories for newspapers and magazines.

== Books by Maud H. Yardley ==
- Sinless (1906)
- Nor All Your Tears (1908)
- To-day and Love (1910)
- At the Door of the Heart (1913)
- Love's Debt (1913)
- For You (1913)
- Because (1913)
- The Willoughbys (1914)
- A Man's Life is Different, or The Sleeping Flame (1914)
- Dare's Halliday Wooing (1915)
- Soulmates (1917)
- Mrs. John (1919)
- Ordered to Marry! (1921)
