= Yardley Taylor =

American arborist and surveyor (1794–1868)

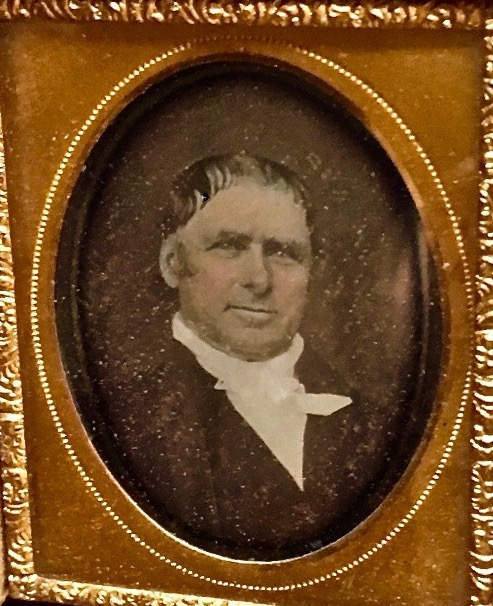
Yardley Taylor (1794-1868) Virginia Quaker abolitionist and map maker. He devoted much of his life to anti-slavery and progressive causes.

Map of Loudoun County, Virginia, by Yardley Taylor, made in the year 1853

Yardley Taylor (December 12, 1794 – February 20, 1868) was an American arborist and surveyor who was active in the abolition movement in Virginia.

== Background ==
A member of the Society of Friends, Taylor lived in Goose Creek, Virginia, a Quaker community. He was an arborist who ran a horticultural business. He also served as a Loudoun County surveyor and rural postal carrier.

Taylor and his wife, Hannah Brown Taylor, raised eight children on their farm, Evergreen, outside Goose Creek village.

In 1853, Taylor wrote a Memoir of Loudoun County. Taylor's knowledge of the roads, byways as well as the landowners of Loudoun county, led him in 1853 to make a highly detailed map of the county.

== 1820s ==
As early as 1824 Taylor was involved in anti-slavery efforts. He was President of the Manumission and Emigration Society of Loudoun, with his brother, Henry S. Taylor, serving as the Society's secretary. Taylor printed letters and articles in Loudoun newspapers which contained information and mission statements of the Society's goals. In August 1827 Taylor organized a three day "Anti-Slavery Convention" in the Goose Creek Meeting school house.

The Manumission and Emigration Society's primary goal was encouraging slave owners to manumit their enslaved workers. The Society also raised money to purchase enslaved men and women and, after manumission, settle them in a non-slave state, or repatriate them to Liberia. This effort was widely supported by many of Taylor's fellow Quakers and other anti-slavery advocates.

However, "colonization" societies eventually proved unpopular with freed blacks, who understandably didn't want to have to leave their homes and families in America in order to experience freedom. Also, the costs of buying enslaved men and women then paying for long ocean voyages proved prohibitively expensive.

== York court case ==
In 1828 Taylor was arrested for helping an enslaved man known as Harry attempt to escape bondage in Loudoun County. Harry was captured on his journey north and documents found on him included a letter from Taylor to fellow Quaker Jonathan Jessup who lived in York, Pennsylvania. In the letter, Taylor asked Jessup to help Harry, describing Harry's dire circumstances in slavery and how his owners were planning to sell him to a buyer in the Deep South. Taylor had also given Harry a handwritten list of towns and mileage leading to York this list was also found on Harry at the time of his capture.

Taylor eventually pled guilty to Loudoun County's charge of "enticing, persuading and advising a certain slave named Harry" to escape. Yardley Taylor paid a fine. Harry's fate is unknown.

== Kitty Payne case ==
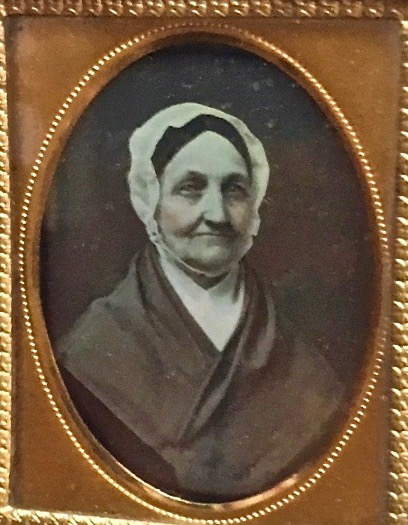
Hannah Brown Taylor (1795-1880) Quaker wife of Yardley Taylor, raised eight children and supported anti-slavery causes.

In 1845, Kitty Payne, and her three children, had been freed by her former owner. Payne moved her young family to Pennsylvania, where she supported herself as a laundress. But on the night of July 24, 1845 Payne and her children were kidnapped by slave catchers and bound into a wagon to take back into Virginia and sell into slavery.

Taylor, along with Quakers from the Pennsylvania and Virginia, raised money for her to hire a lawyer to appeal her kidnapping. The court trial, held in Rappahannock County, Virginia, resulted in Payne and her children regaining their freedom. It is the only recorded Southern court ruling in favor of a former enslaved individual against a white citizen claiming legal ownership over them.

== 1857 broadside ==
In 1857, Taylor was the subject of an anonymously written political broadside, posted around Loudoun County. The broadside was a long screed against Taylor, focusing on his abolitionist work, and naming him the "chief of the local abolitionist clan" and "president of the underground railroad."

The author is thought to be James Treyhern, a pro-slavery Loudoun County resident . Treyhern had attended a 1856 meeting held in Goose Creek which had been also attended by Taylor and other anti-slavery Quakers. The meeting had descended into chaos over the topic of slavery, resulting in one young Quaker fleeing Virginia for his own safety.

== Civil War ==
During the American Civil War, the Confederate authorities didn't trust the Quakers of Loudoun County, and frequently raided their farms. The Union Army also distrusted them. During the "Burning Raid" of November/December 1864, General Ulysses Grant ordered his troops to drive away livestock, destroy crops and burn barns throughout the region. The Taylors lost barns and property in the raid.

In spite of personal losses, Taylor's support of the Union never wavered.

== Post war ==
In June 1865 he wrote a letter to Union appointed Governor of Virginia, Francis Pierpont. In the letter, Yardley Taylor expressed the importance of extending voting rights to black males, using black citizenship in the British West Indies islands of Barbados, Jamaica, and Trinidad as examples to study and follow.

Taylor died in 1868. A reference to his death at age 75, "...from a cold contracted while carrying shingles up a ladder to shingle his house" is in the Alexandria Gazette March 18, 1870 edition. He was buried in the Goose Creek Meeting Burial Ground in Lincoln, Virginia, alongside his wife, Hannah, and many Taylor family members.
