= Yardley Griffin =

- Genres: Gospel, urban contemporary gospel
- Occupation(s): Singer, songwriter, worship leader
- Instrument(s): vocals, singer-songwriter
- Years active: 2015–present
- Labels: Black Market Blue
- Website: yardleyjr.com

Yardley Wendell Griffin, Jr. is an American gospel musician, urban contemporary gospel recording artist, and worship leader. He started his music career, in 2015, with the studio album, Hear Me Now, that was released by Black Market Blue Records. This album was his breakthrough released upon the Billboard magazine charts.

== Music career ==
His music recording career commenced in 2015, with the studio album, Hear Me Now, that was released on September 11, 2015, through Black Label Blue Records. This album was his breakthrough release upon the Billboard magazine charts, while it placed on the Gospel Albums chart, where it peaked at No. 9.

== Personal life ==
He is currently the worship leader at Destiny Church, in Sacramento, California.

== Discography ==
=== Studio albums ===
List of studio albums, with selected chart positions
Title	Album details	Peak chart positions
Title	Album details	US Gos
Hear Me Now	Released: September 11, 2015; Label: Black Market Blue; CD, digital download	9
