= Michael Coates (Quaker missionary) =

English quaker

Michael Coates was an English born Quaker who in South Africa befriended Gandhi and attempted to convert him to Christianity. Coates was one of Gandhi's closest friends in Pretoria, standing up for him in the face of persecution and helping Gandhi gain the political connections necessary to avoid police interference while walking after 9 p.m. Coates was also responsible for introducing Gandhi to Jesus's Sermon on the Mount, giving Gandhi a more intimate understanding of Jesus's gospel of love.
