= Yardley Warner =

American Quaker educator, lawyer, and minister (1815–1885)

Yardley Warner (1815–1885) was a Quaker educator, lawyer, and minister who helped establish schools for African Americans after the American Civil War.

Warner was born in Pennsylvania. He established the neighborhood now known as Warnersville in Greensboro, North Carolina, selling lots to African Americans. In 1876 he established Warner Institute in Jonesboro, Tennessee.
