= Jir Deh, Rudsar =

Jir Deh جيرده
- Village
- Location within Iran
- Coordinates: 36°44′40″N 50°22′40″E
- Country: Iran
- Province: Gilan
- County: Rudsar
- Bakhsh: Rahimabad
- Rural District: Siyarastaq Yeylaq

Population (2006)
  - Total: 71
- Time zone: UTC+3:30 (IRST)
  - Summer (DST): UTC+4:30 (IRDT)

Jir Deh (Persian: جيرده, also Romanized as Jīr Deh; also known as Jardi, Jowr Deh, Jūr Deh, and Jurdi) is a village in Siyarastaq Yeylaq Rural District, Rahimabad District, Rudsar County, Gilan Province, Iran. At the 2006 census, its population was 71, in 28 families.
