= Jane Fletcher (Australian writer) =

(1870–1956) teacher, ornithologist and author

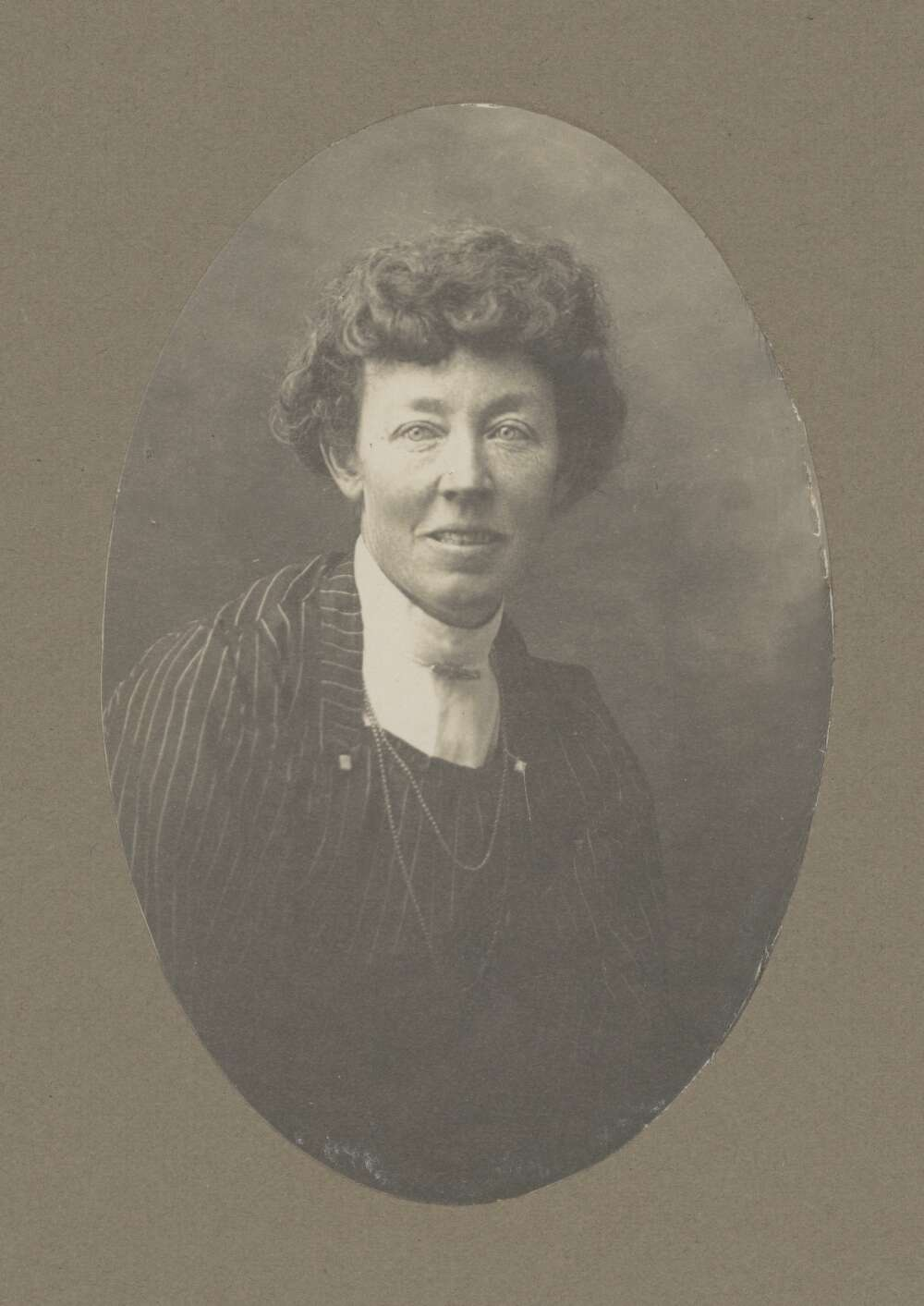
- Born: 18 September 1870; Penshurst
- Died: 15 April 1956 (aged 85); Eaglehawk Neck
- Parent(s): Price Fletcher

Jane Ada Fletcher (1870–1956) was a Tasmanian poet and author, publishing works on ornithology, history, anthropology, and fiction.

== Biography ==
Jane was the daughter of Sarah, née Cooper, and Price Fletcher, a Queensland naturalist and agriculturalist, and whose respective interests in botany and ornithology were an early influence. Bicycle journeys with her younger sister included visits to swamps for observations of birds. She was born at Stonefield station, near Penshurst, Victoria, 18 September 1870, later moving to Queensland and returning to the state before settling in Tasmania, initially with an aunt. She took positions as a school teacher, opened a school, and held senior roles as an educator. Until 1936, when she had a serious accident, her research and field work was employed by amateur ornithologist Gregory Mathews. Fletcher was a member of the Royal Australasian Ornithologists Union at their foundation in 1901, and published in their journal Emu. She was also a member of, and first woman to speak before, the Royal Society of Tasmania. Fletcher died on 15 April 1956 at Eaglehawk Neck, Tasmania.

== Works ==
Fletcher wrote on the indigenous peoples of Australia, and the first to fictionalise their culture for young European readers.

Published works include:

- Stories from Nature (London, 1915),
- Nature and adventure in Australasia for boys and girls (London, 1916)
- Little Brown Piccaninnies of Tasmania (Sydney, 1950),
- Tasmania's Own Birds (1956).
- Articles in the journal Emu.
