= William Yardley (judge) =

British Indian Judge (1810–1878)

Sir William Yardley

Chief Justice of the Supreme Court of Judicature at Bombay
- In office 1852–1858
- Preceded by: Thomas Erskine Perry
- Succeeded by: Matthew Richard Sausse

Puisne Judge of the Supreme Court of Judicature at Bombay
- In office 1847–1852

Personal details
- Born: 1810 England
- Died: 1 March 1878 (aged 67–68) Hadlow Park, Tonbridge, Kent, England
- Spouse: Amelia Yardley
- Children: William
- Profession: Judge, Barrister

Sir William Yardley (1810 – 1 March 1878) was a British judge who served as the Chief Justice of the Supreme Court of Judicature at Bombay from 1852 to 1858.

== Career ==
Yardley was trained as a barrister in England and called to the Bar, practicing on the South-Eastern Circuit. In 1847, he was appointed as a Puisne Judge of the Supreme Court of Judicature at Bombay under British rule. Following the retirement of Sir Thomas Erskine Perry in 1852, Yardley was knighted and elevated to the position of Chief Justice of Bombay, prior to establishment of Bombay High Court. He also became the Vice Chancellor of University of Bombay in 1857.

== Personal life ==
His eldest son, William Yardley (1849–1900), was born in Bombay during his judicial tenure. He was a prominent amateur cricketer for Kent County Cricket Club and Cambridge University.
