= William Yardley (cricketer) =

English cricketer and playwright

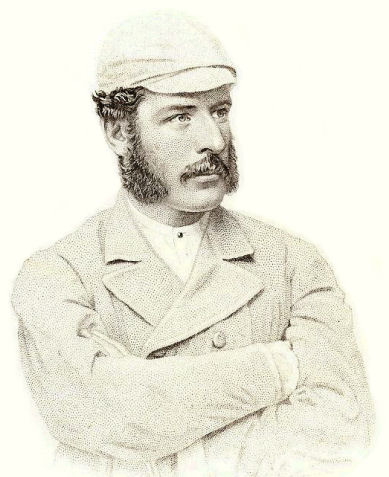

Personal information
- Full name: William Yardley
- Born: 10 June 1849; Bombay, British India
- Died: 28 October 1900 (aged 51); Kingston-upon-Thames, Surrey, England
- Batting: Right-handed
- Bowling: Slow left-arm orthodox
- Role: Batsman, wicket-keeper

Domestic team information
- Years: Team
- 1868–1878: Kent
- 1869–1872: Cambridge University
- FC debut: 5 August 1868 Kent v Gentlemen of MCC
- Last FC: 22 August 1878 Kent v Lancashire

Career statistics
Competition	First-class
Matches	83
Runs scored	3,609
Batting average	25.77
100s/50s	3/19
Top score	130
Balls bowled	360
Wickets	7
Bowling average	32.42
5 wickets in innings	0
10 wickets in match	0
Best bowling	2/10
Catches/stumpings	43/6
- Source: ESPNcricinfo, 28 November 2007

William Yardley (10 June 1849 – 28 October 1900) was an English cricketer who played first-class cricket for Kent County Cricket Club from 1868 to 1878 and for Cambridge University from 1869 to 1872. In the early 1870s, only W. G. Grace was reckoned his superior amongst amateur batsmen. Yardley was also an actor, playwright and drama critic.

Yardley was born at Bombay (now Mumbai) in India, the eldest son of Sir William Yardley, Chief Justice of Bombay. He was educated at Rugby School and Trinity College, Cambridge. He was admitted at the Middle Temple in 1868 and called to the Bar on 27 January 1873. He practised on the South-Eastern Circuit. He acted for Canterbury Old Stagers and with Herbert Gardner wrote some of the best plays and epilogues they produced.

== Cricket career ==
Yardley played cricket for Kent from 1868 to 1878, but his most famous deeds were for Cambridge University, for whom he played from 1869 to 1872. Two of his three hundreds were made in the University Match. His 100 in 1870 was the first in the history of the fixture and his 130 in 1872 was his career highest score. The 1870 fixture was "Cobden's Match", when F. C. Cobden's taking of the last three Oxford wickets in consecutive balls gave Cambridge victory by 2 runs, but Cobden's heroics would not have been possible but for Yardley's contribution.

Yardley appeared nine times for the Gentlemen in their fixture against the Players, and had the fine average of 36.25, with three fifties and a highest score of 83. When he and W. G. Grace were on the same team they used to have a small bet on who would record the higher score. Yardley was proud that in the Gentlemen v Players match at Lord's in 1871, he beat Grace's score in both innings. He was the "ghost writer" of one of Grace's four "autobiographies": The History of a Hundred Centuries, published by Gill in 1895.

In 83 matches Yardley scored 3,609 runs at the fine average for the period of 25.77, with three centuries. In addition to his batting, he occasionally kept wicket. His Wisden obituary says of him: "... his style was free and commanding and his hitting brilliant in the extreme. He thought himself that the finest innings he ever played was 73 for South against North at Prince's on a very difficult wicket in May, 1872."

== Later life ==
Yardley was an actor and a significant playwright. In 1877 he was one of the notables that Lillie Langtry met on her memorable debut London society gathering. He was part author of a burlesque entitled Little Jack Sheppard and of farces called The Passport and Hobbies (1885). He was also a producer and a theatre critic.

Yardley died at Kingston-upon-Thames in Surrey at the age of 51. He is buried in Brookwood Cemetery in Woking. He was married to Maud H. Yardley, who after his death became a novelist.

== Bibliography ==
- Carlaw, Derek (2020). Kent County Cricketers, A to Z: Part One (1806–1914) (PDF). Cardiff: ACS.
- ESPNcricinfo profile, including his Wisden obituary
- Grenville Simons William Yardley: Master of Bat and Burlesque (Words & Wickets) Wisteria Books 1997 ISBN 978-0-9527760-0-0
