= John F. Yardley =

American engineer

- Born: February 1, 1925; St. Louis, Missouri, US
- Died: June 26, 2001 (aged 76); St. Louis, Missouri, US
- Education: Iowa State College (BS 1944); Washington University in St. Louis (MS 1950)
- Occupation: Engineer
- Employer: National Aeronautics and Space Administration
- Spouse: Phyllis Steele
- Children: 5
- Awards: NASA Public Service Award (2); NASA Distinguished Service Medal

John F. Yardley (February 1, 1925 – June 26, 2001) was an American engineer who worked for the McDonnell Aircraft Corporation and the National Aeronautics and Space Administration (NASA). He joined McDonnell in 1946, and contributed to the design and development of aircraft such as the McDonnell FH Phantom, F2H Banshee and F-101 Voodoo.

He was the McDonnell project engineer for the Project Mercury spacecraft from 1958 to 1960, and was its the launch operations manager at Cape Canaveral from 1960 to 1964, and its technical director for Project Gemini from 1964 to 1968. In 1968, he became vice president and deputy general manager of the Eastern Division of McDonnell-Douglas Astronautics, and worked on Project Apollo and Skylab.

In 1974, he became NASA's associate administrator for crewed space flight. After the inaugural flight of the Space Shuttle in 1981, he returned to McDonnell-Douglas as president of its McDonnell Douglas Astronautics subsidiary, a position he held until he retired in 1989. He was known for "Yardley's Law": "Pretty is what works", his response to someone who said that the Mercury spacecraft looked like a waste paper bin.

== Early life ==
John F. Yardley was born in St. Louis, Missouri, on February 1, 1925, the son of F. A. Yardley, a baseball player, and his wife Johnnie née Patterson. He graduated from high school in 1942 when he was sixteen years old, and was awarded a scholarship to Washington University in St. Louis, where he studied mechanical engineering. Due to World War II, his course was an accelerated one, with four semesters per year instead of the usual two. He joined the United States Navy Reserve, and enrolled in the V-12 Navy College Training Program. In 1943, the Navy sent him to Iowa State College to study aeronautical engineering, which was not offered by Washington University. He graduated with his Bachelor of Science degree in 1944, and entered active service with the Navy. He was trained in aircraft maintenance in Memphis, Tennessee, and Seattle, Washington, and worked on maintenance of the Navy's Consolidated PBY Catalina flying boats.

== Aircraft and spacecraft ==
Discharged from the Navy in 1946, Yardley returned to St. Louis. He married Phyllis Steele, with whom he had five children, four daughters and a son, and took a job with the McDonnell Aircraft Corporation, a local aircraft manufacturer, where he worked as a stress tester. In 1950 he earned a Master of Science degree in applied mechanics from Washington University. He worked his way up to becoming chief strength engineer from 1955 to 1958. Along the way, he contributed to the design and development of aircraft such as the McDonnell FH Phantom, McDonnell F2H Banshee and McDonnell F-101 Voodoo. In the late 1950s, McDonnell began working on the design of spacecraft, starting with an unsuccessful bid for the United States Air Force's Dyna Soar.

McDonnell was successful with its bid to build the Project Mercury spacecraft, which would carry the first Americans into space. Yardley was project engineer at McDonnell for the Mercury spacecraft design from 1958 to 1960. He then worked at Cape Canaveral as the launch operations manager for Project Mercury. From 1964 to 1968, Yardley was the technical director of Project Gemini, the successor to Project Mercury. In 1968, he became vice president and deputy general manager of the Eastern Division of McDonnell-Douglas Astronautics, a subsidiary of the new company created by McDonnell's merger with the Douglas Aircraft Company in 1967. In this role, he worked on Project Apollo and Skylab.

In 1974, Yardley joined the National Aeronautics and Space Administration (NASA) as its associate administrator for crewed space flight. This was a difficult time for crewed space flight, with the transition from expendable launch vehicles to the reusable Space Shuttle. Yardley left NASA after the first successful flight of the Space Shuttle in 1981, and returned to St. Louis and McDonnell-Douglas as president of McDonnell Douglas Astronautics, a position he held until he retired in 1989. He became known for "Yardley's Law": "Pretty is what works", his response to someone who said that the Mercury spacecraft looked like a waste paper bin. Speaking about his anxiety before the inaugural launch of the Space Shuttle, he said: "The things that you have to be careful about are the unknowns, things that have never happened before. A new engineering gremlin could crawl out of the woodwork, one nobody could have predicted."

Yardley was elected a fellow of the National Academy of Engineering in 1977, and was also a fellow of the American Institute of Aeronautics and Astronautics and the American Astronautical Society. He received a NASA Public Service award for his contribution to Project Mercury in 1963, and to Project Gemini programs in 1966. He was awarded the American Society of Mechanical Engineers' Spirit of St. Louis Medal in 1973, the NASA Distinguished Service Medal in 1981, and the National Space Club's Goddard Trophy in 1983.

On June 26, 2001, Yardley died at his home in St. Louis from complications from cancer.
