= George Washington Walker =

Quaker missionary (1800–1859)

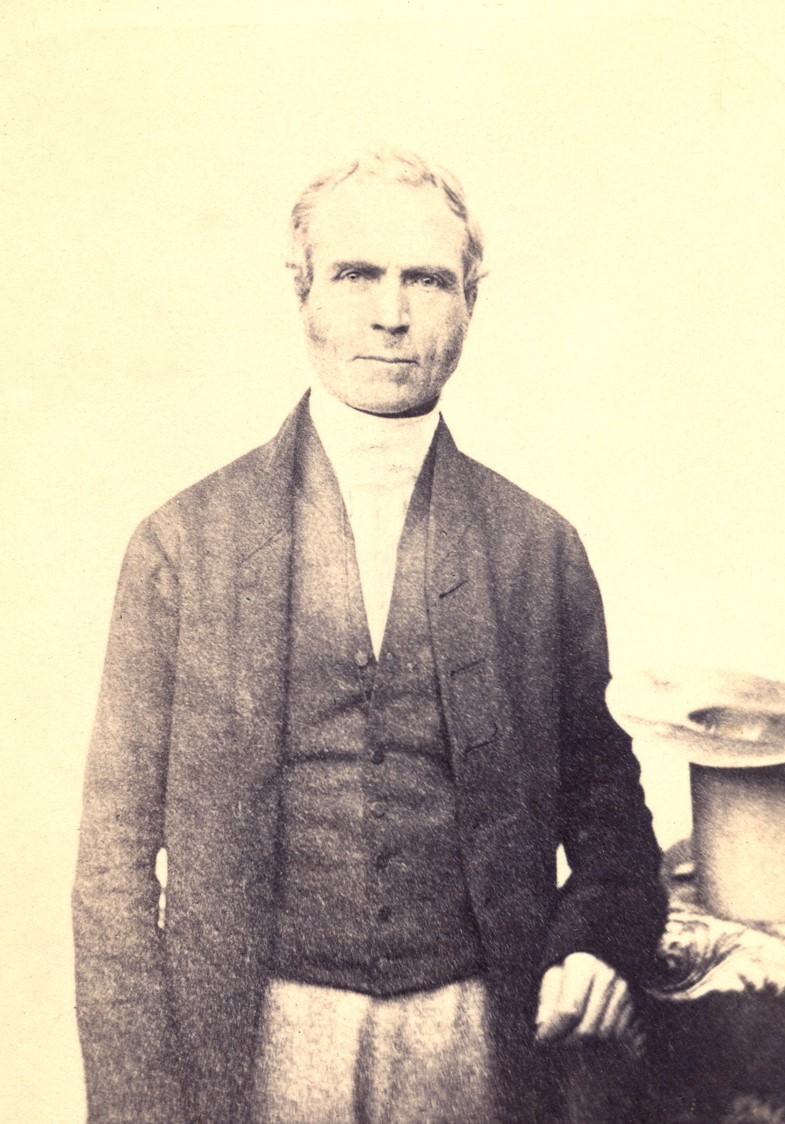
George Washington Walker

George Washington Walker (19 March 1800 – 2 February 1859) was an English-born Australian missionary for the church called Religious Society of Friends, or Quakers.

Walker was born to Unitarian parents in London, the twenty-first child of John Walker by his second wife, Elizabeth. He was educated at a school in Barnard Castle. He was introduced to the Society of Friends in his teenage years when he worked in Newcastle for a linen draper who was a Quaker, but Walker did not become a Quaker himself until 1827. Walker also participated in the temperance movement.

Walker met his future missionary partner James Backhouse in 1820 or 1821. Between September 1831 and February 1832, Walker and Backhouse travelled from England to Hobart, Van Diemen's Land (modern Tasmania). Between 1832 and 1838, they made a tour of the penal settlements in Australia, Van Diemen's Land, and Norfolk Island. Between 1838 and 1840, they left Australia and did missionary work in Mauritius and South Africa.

In 1840, Walker ended his travels. He returned to Hobart in September and was married to Sarah Benson Mather on 15 December 1840. He set up a business as a draper, and, in 1844, helped establish the Hobart Savings Bank which eventually became the Trust Bank. He worked at his business and for the Quakers and temperance until he died on 2 February 1859 in Hobart.

In 1994, the Hobart Savings Bank endowed a scholarship at the University of Tasmania named the "George Washington Walker Trust Bank Perpetual Undergraduate Scholarship"; it was to be awarded to students of commerce or economics.

His eldest son was James Backhouse Walker.
