= John Yardley (painter) =

British watercolor artist

- Born: March 11, 1933 (age 93); Beverley, Yorkshire, England
- Education: Self-taught
- Known for: Watercolour painting
- Movement: Impressionism

John Yardley (born 11 March 1933) is an English watercolour painter. He is a member of the Royal Institute of Painters in Water Colours (RI) and is known for his impressionistic watercolour paintings of streets, landscapes, travel scenes and other subjects.

== Biography ==
John Yardley was born on 11 March 1933 in Beverley, Yorkshire. His family moved to Berkshire after the beginning of the Second World War, and subsequently to Hastings in 1945. Yardley began drawing while at school, but received no formal art training.

After leaving school, Yardley completed National Service and subsequently pursued a career in banking. According to biographical accounts, he continued to paint and draw alongside his professional career and became interested in the work of British painters including Edward Seago and Edward Wesson.

In the 1960s Yardley began exhibiting his work publicly. The Royal Institute of Painters in Water Colours records that he first submitted work to the RI in 1960. He also began demonstrating watercolour techniques to local art societies during the 1970s. His first one-man exhibition was held in 1980.

During his banking career, Yardley's work was shown through galleries and exhibitions, and he travelled extensively in Britain and Europe. His association with the Alexander Gallery in Clifton, Bristol, became an important stage in his development as a professional artist.

In 1986, at the age of 53, Yardley left banking and became a full-time professional painter. He subsequently worked as a tutor and conducted watercolour workshops and demonstrations. He also participated in instructional films and other educational projects devoted to watercolour painting.

Yardley was elected to membership of the Royal Institute of Painters in Water Colours in 1990. He has continued to exhibit his work and to participate in demonstrations and exhibitions associated with the RI. In 2018 he received the TheArtsBox Solo Prize at the RI's 206th exhibition for a group of paintings.

In 2019 an exhibition entitled John Yardley: A Life in Watercolour was held at TheArtsBox in Vicenza, Italy, in collaboration with the Royal Institute of Painters in Water Colours. The exhibition consisted of 28 watercolours and was accompanied by a demonstration by Yardley.

== Artistic work ==
Yardley is primarily associated with watercolour painting, although his work also includes paintings in oils. His subjects include street scenes, landscapes, marketplaces, flowers, travel scenes, railway subjects and maritime imagery.

His paintings are characterised by a relatively direct approach to watercolour, with emphasis on light, colour and movement. Art dealers and biographical sources have described his technique as using relatively few brushstrokes and limited embellishment in order to retain the immediacy of a scene.

Yardley has frequently painted subjects from his travels in Europe, including cities such as Venice and Rome, as well as British coastal and urban scenes. His work has also included flower studies and domestic subjects.

The Royal Institute has described Yardley as an established figure in British watercolour painting and records exhibitions, demonstrations and publications associated with his career.

== Exhibitions and awards ==
Yardley first submitted work to the Royal Institute of Painters in Water Colours in 1960 and was elected a member in 1990. He has also exhibited with the Royal Watercolour Society.

In 1989, Yardley received the Catto Gallery Award for work shown at the Royal Watercolour Society Open Exhibition, according to gallery biographical records. In 1990 he received the Watercolour Foundation Prize for work exhibited at the Royal Institute and was elected to membership of the institution.

At the 206th Royal Institute exhibition in 2018, Yardley received the TheArtsBox Solo Prize for a group of paintings.

In 2019 he exhibited at TheArtsBox in Vicenza in the exhibition John Yardley: A Life in Watercolour, which was organised in collaboration with the Royal Institute.

== Books and instructional works ==
Yardley has written and been the subject of several books on watercolour painting. The Royal Institute lists the following publications and instructional films associated with his career:

- The Art of John Yardley by Ron Ranson, published by David & Charles.
- Watercolour: A Personal View by John Yardley, published by David & Charles in 1996.
- Watercolour Impressionists by Ron Ranson, which includes Yardley among the artists discussed.
- John Yardley: As I See It by Steve Hall, published in 2009.
- John Yardley by Susanne Haines, published by Halsgrove.
- John Yardley, Contemporary British Water-colour Artists, published by Shandong Fine Arts Publishing.

Yardley has also appeared in instructional films and DVDs, including Sunlight in Watercolour, Venice in Watercolour, Variety in Watercolour and Watercolour Moments.
