= Martha Savory Yeardley =

British Quaker writer 1781–1851

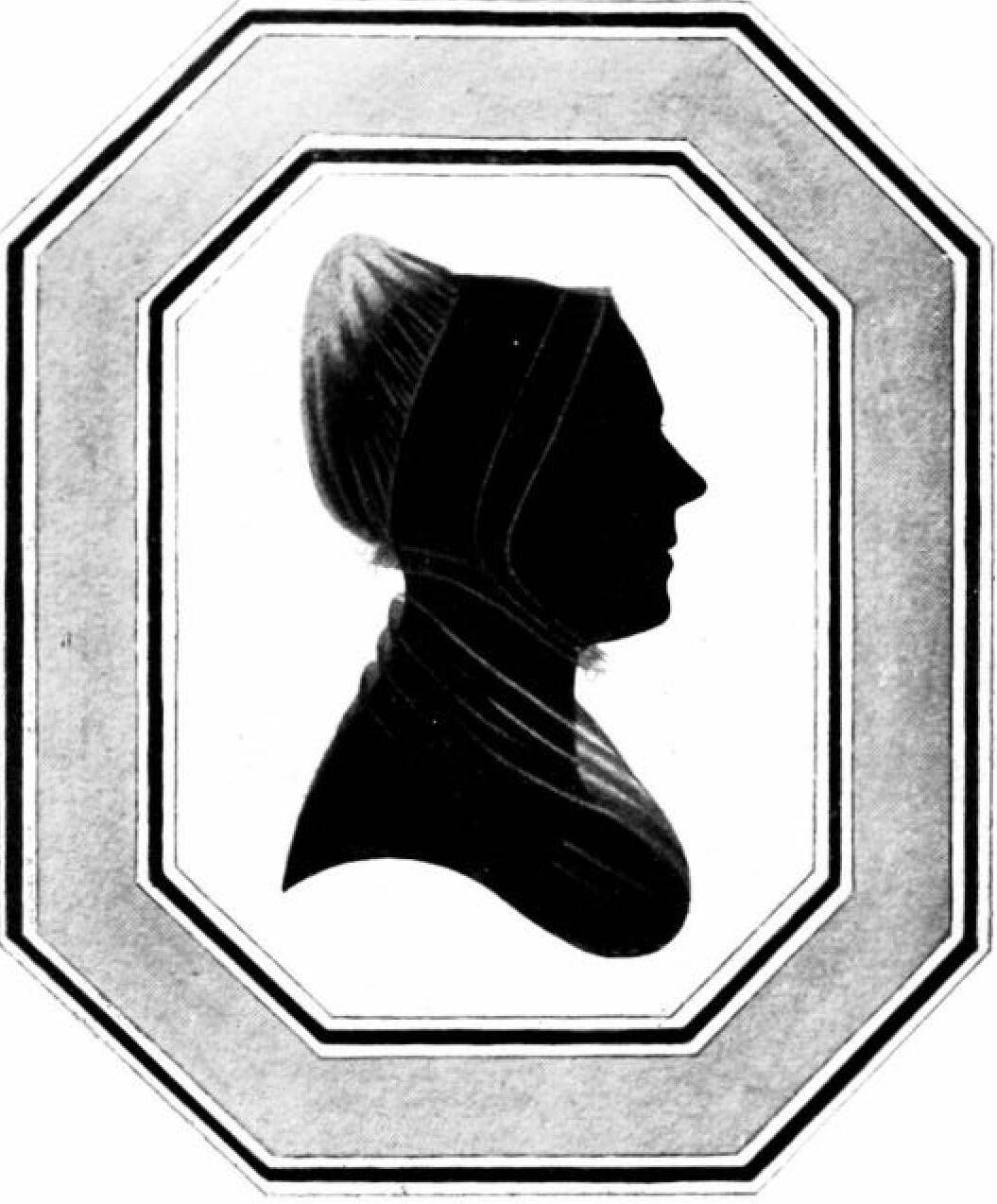
- silhouette by Thomas Pole
- Born: Martha Savory; 8 March 1781; London
- Died: 8 May 1851 (aged 70)
- Resting place: Stoke Newington, Middlesex
- Occupations: minister, missionary, poet, travel & educational writer
- Spouse: John Yeardley
- Writing career
- Pen name: Mrs Savory; M. Savory; M. Yeardley; M. Y.; Mrs Smith
- Language: English
- Years active: 1805-1848

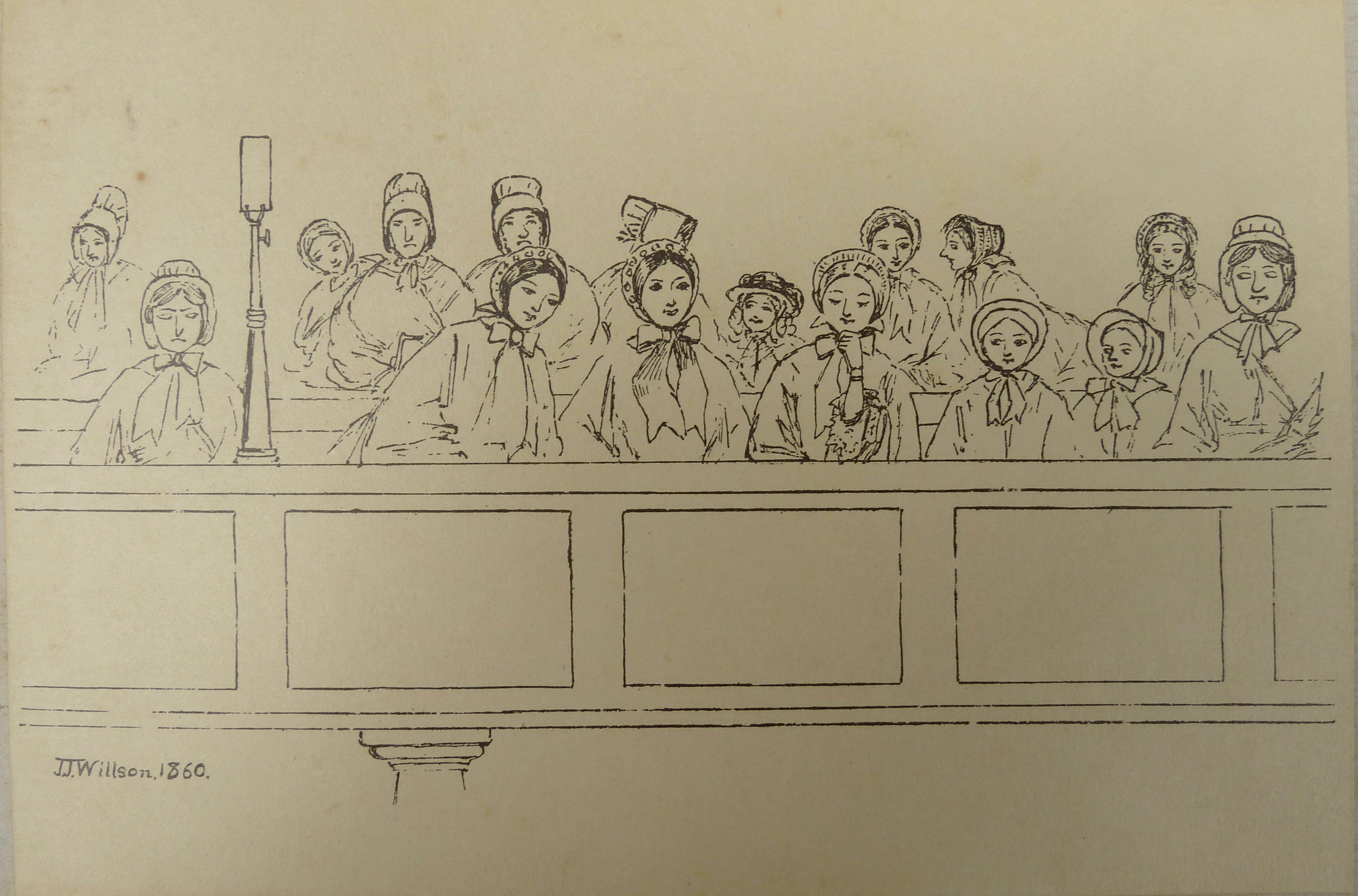
"The women's side" by John Joseph Willson (c.1837-1903) from a set of pen & ink sketches of the Society of Friends annual meeting, Devonshire House, London, May, 1860.

Martha Yeardley (née Savory, March 8, 1781 – May 8, 1851) was an English poet, Quaker minister, and author of educational works and travel literature.

== Life ==
Martha Savory Yeardley was born in London on 8 March 1781 to Anna and Joseph Savory, the latter a Quaker goldsmith. She had two sisters and a brother, and three half-sisters from her father's second marriage to Mary Pryor after the death of Anna Savory in or around 1785. At one point, she and her siblings lived in Pentonville across the road from Charles Lamb. She was educated "at Frenchay" where many Quaker merchants were established. Her family's financial resources have been described as "ample." She published her first work, Inspiration, a Poetical Essay, in 1805, followed by two other poetry collections before the end of the decade. She became committed to Quaker ministry and undertook "gospel tours" in Europe. In 1824 on one such tour she met her future husband, John Yeardley (1786-1858), and married him in 1826. Over the twenty-five years of their partnership, the couple made five further tours (1827-28, 1828-33, 1833-34, 1842-43, and 1843-50). During the fourth tour, Yeardley established a school for girls in Corfu. Yeardley continued to publish poetry, as well as various works co-authored with her husband, often with William Darton, a Quaker publisher particularly known for children's titles. In addition to these substantive publications, the Yeardley's co-authored a series of fourteen tracts for use in their missionary work. Martha Yeardley was the "driving force of the [couple's] literary partnership," according to one commentator. "Worn out with travel," she died on 8 May, 1851.

== Works ==
- Savory, Martha. Inspiration, a Poetical Essay. London: J. and A. Arch, 1805.
- Savory, M. Poetical Tales, Founded on Facts. London: Darton Harvey, 1808. Reissued by James Goodwin as Pathetic Tales by "Mrs. Smith" in 1813 after Yeardley sought to suppress it.
- Savory, Mrs. Life's Vicissitudes, or, winter's tears. Original poems. London: G. Robinson for the author, 1809.
- Savory, Martha. An Original Wreath of Forget-me-not. Presented to Those who Love to Reflect on Heavenly Things. Published for the benefit of the Infant School at Burton. London/York: Harvey and Darton, Edmund Fry/William Alexander, 1829. (U.S. edition, 1829; 2nd UK edition, 1830; reissued by Jane Trathan, Falmouth, in 1835.)
- Anon. Christian Faith and Benevolence Exemplified, in an institution for poor children, at Locle, in Switzerland, wherein labour is combined with education. London: Harvey and Darton, 1829.
- Yeardley, M. Questions on the Gospels. London: Darton and Harvey, ca. 1835.
- Yeardley, J. and M. A Brief Memoir of Mary Ann Calame, with some account of the Institution at Locle, Switzerland. London: Darton and Harvey, 1835.
- Extracts from the Letters of John and Martha Yeardley, Whilst on a Religious Visit to Some Parts of the Continent of Europe, the Ionian Isles, &c. Lindfield: W. Eade, at the Schools of Industry, 1835.
- Yeardley, M. Conversations between a Governess and her Pupils. Elicited by Scriptural Readings, Designed for Young Persons. London: Darton and Clark, ca. 1838.
- Yeardley, M. True Tales from Foreign Lands. In Verse. Designed for the Young. London/York: Darton and Clark, E. Fry/W. Hipsley, ca. 1835.
- Yeardley, J., and M. Yeardley. Eastern Customs; Illustrative of Scripture Passages: with Some Observations on the Character, Manners, &c. of the Greeks. London: Harvey and Darton, 1842.
- M. Y. Poetical Sketches of Scripture Characters, London, 1848.
- The manuscript diary of their Greek journey was, in 1900, held at Devonshire House.

== Etexts ==
- Poetical Tales founded on Facts, 1808. (Etext, Google)
- Extracts from the Letters of John and Martha Yeardley, 1835. (Etext, Internet Archive)
- Eastern Customs; Illustrative of Scripture Passages, 1842. (Etext, Google)

== Notes and references ==
=== References ===
- Memoir and Diary of John Yeardley, Minister of the Gospel. Ed. Charles Tylor. Philadelphia: Henry Longstreeth, 1860. (Etext, Project Gutenberg)
- Biography in Dictionary of National Biography
