= Robert Blake Yardley =

Robert Blake Yardley (1858–1943) was a British Barrister and philatelist who signed the Roll of Distinguished Philatelists in 1921. He was a member of the Yardley soap manufacturing family.

Yardley's worldwide collection was auctioned by H.R. Harmer over sixteen days in 1944–45.

== Publications ==
- The Dies of the Postage Stamps of Portugal of the Reigns of Dona Maria II and Dom Pedro V. 1907.
- The Samoa Express Postage Stamps. 1916.
