= John H. Yardley =

American pathologist

John Howard Yardley
- Born: June 7, 1926; Columbia, South Carolina
- Died: December 7, 2011 (aged 85); Towson, Maryland
- Occupation: Physician
- Known for: One of the founders of the field of gastrointestinal pathology

John Howard "Jack" Yardley (June 7, 1926 – December 7, 2011) was an American pathologist known for his work in gastrointestinal pathology. He worked at Johns Hopkins Hospital from 1954 until his retirement in 2006. He served as Baxley Professor of Pathology and director of the Department of Pathology (a position known as Pathologist-in-Chief) from 1988 to 1992. He also served as associate dean of the Johns Hopkins University School of Medicine from 1977 to 1984. He is regarded as one of the founders of the field of gastrointestinal pathology.

== Early life and education ==
Yardley was born in Columbia, South Carolina; his father was an executive with Republic Steel. The family moved frequently during his childhood. He graduated from Western Reserve High School in Cleveland in 1944 and immediately entered the U.S. Navy as an electrician's mate, serving for two years. He then attended Birmingham–Southern College in Birmingham, Alabama, graduating in 1949 with a degree in chemistry. He earned his M.D. degree from Johns Hopkins School of Medicine in 1953. After a year of internship in internal medicine at Vanderbilt University Hospital, he returned to Johns Hopkins for a residency in pathology, and remained there for the rest of his professional career.

== Career ==
He was the author of more than 120 articles and 20 book chapters, as well as editing the definitive monograph The Gastrointestinal Tract (1977, Williams and Wilkins). He was one of the founders of the Gastrointestinal Pathology Society.

in the 1970s he established a fellowship in gastrointestinal and liver pathology at Hopkins; in 1999 it was endowed and named the John H. Yardley Fellowship in Gastrointestinal Pathology.

Dr. Edward D. Miller, dean of the medical faculty and CEO of Johns Hopkins Medicine, said that Yardley was "one of the founding fathers of the field of gastrointestinal pathology," adding that he made "groundbreaking observations on Whipple's disease of the gastrointestinal tract and helped define the current classification system for neoplastic dysplasia in the colon and esophagus."

== Personal life ==
He and his wife of 58 years, the former Eritha von der Goltz, were longtime residents of Roland Park in Baltimore, Maryland. They had a son and two daughters. He died December 7, 2011, in Towson, Maryland, at the age of 85.
