= John Yeardley =

Quaker missionary (1786–1858)

John Yeardley (3 January 1786 – 11 August 1858) was a Quaker missionary.

He was the son of Joel and Frances Yeardley, small dairy farmers at Orgreave, near Rotherham, Yorkshire. John was admitted a member of the Society of Friends in his twentieth year, entered a manufactory in Barnsley, and married, in 1809, Elizabeth Dunn, a convinced Friend much his senior. He commenced preaching in 1815, moving from place to place in the northern counties.

In 1821 Dunn died, and, led by a persistent "call," Yeardley decided to settle at Pyrmont in Germany, where a small body of Friends existed. For his subsistence he arranged to represent some merchants who imported linen yarn, and later on he commenced bleaching on his own account. His philanthropic labours included the establishment of schools and meetings for the young, and many notable persons, including the prince and princess of Prussia, came to hear him preach. In 1824 he accompanied Martha Savory, an English Quaker, on a gospel journey up the Rhine from Elberfeld to Württemberg, Tübingen, and other German towns, through Switzerland to Congénies in Central France, where some Friends were and (as of 1897) still are settled. They visited Theodor Fliedner at Kaiserswerth, and all the principal religious and philanthropic institutions on their route.

Upon reaching England they were married at Gracechurch Street meeting on 13 December 1826, resuming soon after their missionary labours in Pyrmont, Friesland, and Switzerland, and visiting asylums, reformatories, and Moravian schools.

During a short time spent in England, the Yeardleys applied themselves to the study of modern Greek in preparation for a visit to the isles, for which they started on 21 June 1833. They were warmly received by Edmond de Pressensé in Paris, and by Professors Ehrmann and Frédéric Cuvier at Strasbourg. In Corfu they established a girls' school, also a model farm, obtaining from the authorities there a grant of land upon which prisoners were permitted to supply the labour.

After eight years at home, spent studying languages, in 1842 the Yeardleys returned for the fourth time to France and Germany. In 1850, during a stay in Berlin, they became acquainted with August Neander. Martha Savory Yeardley died on 8 May 1851, but her husband continued his travels to Norway in 1852, and to South Russia and Constantinople in 1853.

In his seventy-second year, he commenced to study Turkish and started for the East on 15 June 1858. After some work in Constantinople, and while waiting for his equipment and tents to proceed to the interior of Asia Minor, Yeardley was smitten with paralysis at Isnik, and was compelled to return to England, where he died on 11 August 1858. He was buried at Stoke Newington on the 18th.

As a preacher Yeardley's racy humour, with occasional lapses into his broad native Barnsley dialect, added to his uncompromising directness, did him good service. As a linguist his achievements in preaching without interpreters were remarkable, considering that his early education included no Latin.

He used tracts largely as a vehicle for spreading the gospel. These, written and sometimes translated by himself, were founded upon incidents and characters met during his travels. They are catalogued by Smith.

== Works ==
- With Martha Savory Yeardley. A Brief Memoir of Mary Ann Calame, with some account of the Institution at Locle, Switzerland, London, 1835.
- With Martha Savory Yeardley. Extracts from the Letters of J. and M. Yeardley, from the continent, was published at Lindfield, 1835.
- With Martha Savory Yeardley. Eastern Customs illustrative of Scripture, London, 1842.
- The manuscript diary of their Greek journey was, in 1900, at Devonshire House
