= Robert Forster (Quaker) =

British Quaker (1791–1873)

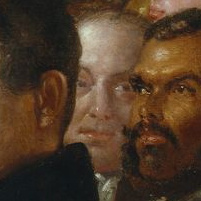
- in the centre (to the left Barbadian hero Samuel Jackman Prescod and to the right Jean-Baptiste Symphor Linstant de Pradine from Haiti)
- Born: 1791
- Died: 11 October 1873 (aged 81–82)
- Known for: Abolitionist who visited France, Holland and Russia to gain support

Robert Forster (1791 – 11 October 1873) was a British Quaker. He was a surveyor, an estate manager and an abolitionist. He took a lifelong interest in education. He was cared for by his younger sister Anne Forster who died three days after him. He had notable brothers as well as sisters Mary Forster and Sarah Forster who were leading Quakers.

== Life ==
Robert Forster was born in 1791 into a well known Quaker family. He was one of the ten children of Elizabeth (born Hayward) and William Forster. His father was a schoolmaster who became a land surveyor.

His sisters and his brothers William and Josiah were very active doing good works and it was Robert who turned his attention's to the family's surveying business. He was also employed by the Earl of Darnley before he became an Earl as his steward. His employer had plans for the village of Northfleet in Kent and Forster was empowered to employ builders to extend Northfleet.

He was a member of the British and Foreign School Society and served on their committee for all of his life starting in 1817.

Forster is on the right of centre, but obscured, near the front in this painting which is of the 1840 Anti-Slavery Convention. Move your cursor to identify him or click icon to enlarge

A picture was commissioned that showed the delegates, including Robert Forster, of the new British and Foreign Anti-Slavery Society which was formed in 1839. The painting captured this important international convention in June 1840. Also in the foreground of this painting are Robert's brothers, William and Josiah amongst other significant figures. This new society's aim was "The universal extinction of slavery and the slave trade and the protection of the rights and interests of the enfranchised population in the British possessions and of all persons captured as slaves."

Forster was a member of deputations to gather support for the complete end to slavery sent to European governments after a Quaker meeting in 1856. Robert went to Paris in 1856 and the following year he went to both Germany and the Netherlands. In 1858 he travelled still further to northern Europe including Russia.

Robert's interest in education saw him involved with a Quaker school at Croydon, at Ackworth School and at Grove House School in Tottenham. He wanted to ensure that science was an important part of their teaching.

Robert was unable to care for himself when he was older and he was cared for by Anne Forster who was one of his philanthropists sisters. She had been born in 1797 and had published "To Butchers, their Men and Boys". His other sisters were Mary and Sarah. Mary lived in Devon for a long time but on her return home she visited women prisoners and in 1837 was appointed an elder in Tottenham. Sarah became a minister in 1848. Robert died on 11 October 1873 and Anne died three days later.
