= George Newman (physician) =

English physician (1870–1948)

Sir George Newman GBE KCB FRSE
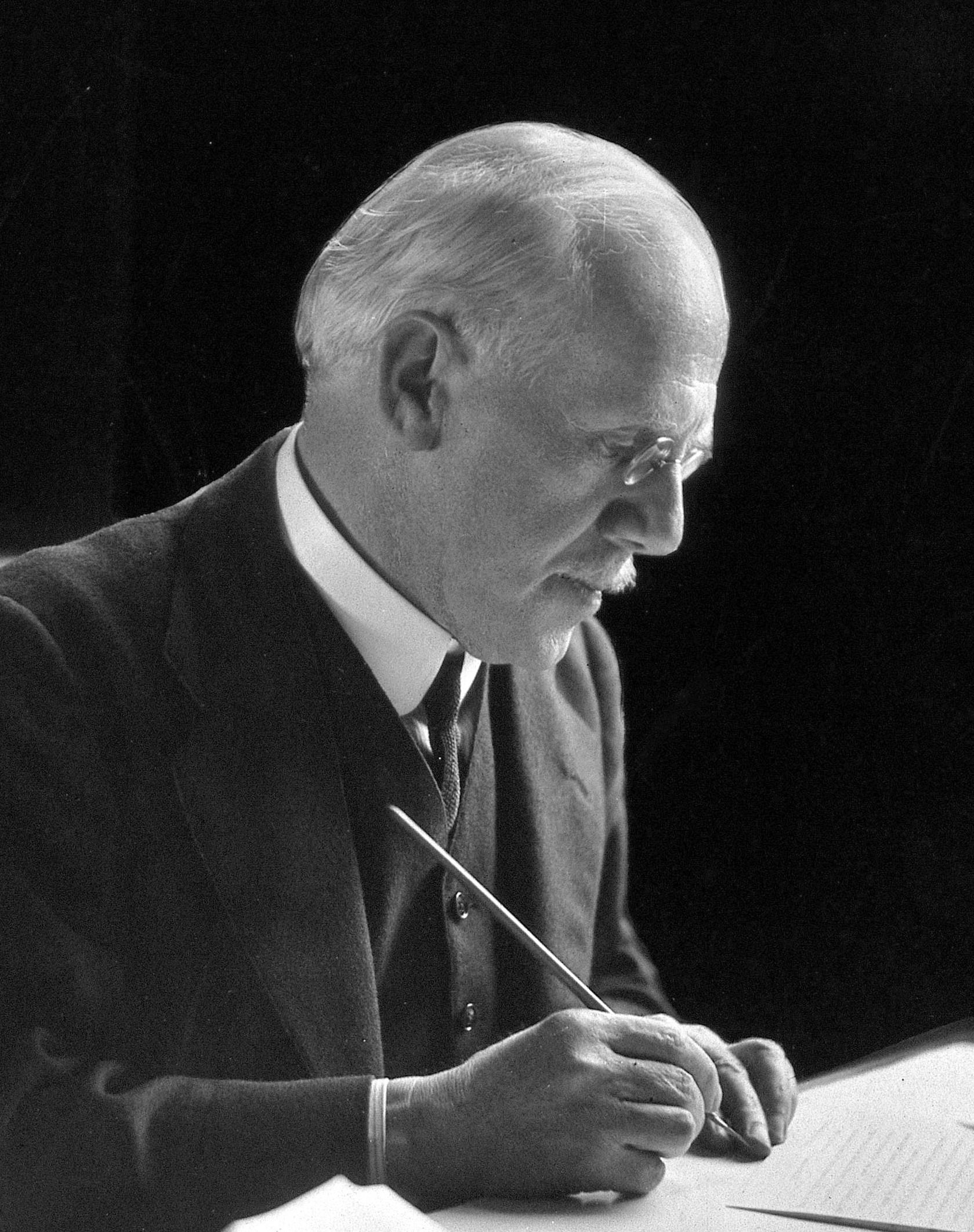

Chief Medical Officer for Her Majesty's Government
- In office 1919–1935
- Preceded by: Arthur Newsholme
- Succeeded by: Wilson Jameson

Personal details
- Born: 23 October 1870 Leominster, England
- Died: 26 May 1948 (aged 77) The Retreat, York, England
- Education: University of Cambridge

Sir George Newman (23 October 1870 – 26 May 1948) was an English public health physician, Quaker, the first Chief Medical Officer to the Ministry of Health in England, and wrote a seminal treatise on the social problems causing infant mortality.

== Biography ==
George Newman was born in Leominster, Herefordshire, the fourth of six children of Henry Stanley Newman and Mary Anna Pumphrey. His father was a Quaker who undertook several missionary journeys, including one to India, and edited The Friend, a Quaker journal. Newman was educated at two Quaker schools, Sidcot School in North Somerset (1881–1885) and Bootham School in York (1885–1887). He initially planned to become a missionary, but then decided to study medicine, starting at the University of Edinburgh Medical School and continuing at King's College London. After qualifying he studied for his MD at Edinburgh, receiving the gold medal for his year, before winning a scholarship to study public health and gaining his Diploma in Public Health in 1895 from the University of Cambridge.

He became a demonstrator in bacteriology and lecturer in infectious diseases at King's. In 1900 he became Medical Officer to the Borough of Finsbury in inner London and the rural county of Bedfordshire. His experiences in these posts led him to publish Infant Mortality: a Social Problem in 1906. This has remained a medical classic, pointing out the unchanged infant mortality rate over the preceding fifty years, and identifying the causes and areas potentially open to intervention. He was Gresham Professor of Physic. In 1907 he was appointed by Sir Robert Morant, Permanent Secretary to the Board of Education, as Chief Medical Officer to the Board, and in 1919 he was also appointed Chief Medical Officer to the Ministry of Health. The annual reports he wrote for both these posts were widely acclaimed as important and influential.

In the 1930's he was joint treasurer of the General Medical Council with Sir Herbert Lightfoot Eason.

== Family ==
In August 1898 he married Adelaide Constance Thorp (d.1946), who was an artist. They had no children. They lived at Harrow Weald after he retired in 1935. He died in 1948 at The Retreat, York.

== Quaker ==
Born into a Quaker family, he remained a committed Christian throughout his life. From 1899, for some forty years, he was the (anonymous) editor of the Friends' Quarterly Examiner, a Quaker journal. In autumn 1914 he was involved in the establishment of the Friends' Ambulance Unit, which provided medical care for soldiers and civilians in the war zone, and following the introduction of conscription in 1916 he helped to negotiate exemptions for Quakers already serving with the FAU.

== Education ==
In 1923 Newman was invited to address the centenary celebrations of his old school, Bootham. He referred to Alcuin, an eighth century educator and deacon whose three guiding principles were: holy living and holy learning; teaching understanding rather than repetition; and, finally, that education should be 'wisely and liberally furnished'. Newman believed that Quaker schools such as Bootham embodied these principles. He maintained an interest in medical education, and in 1923 he wrote Recent Advances in Medical Education.

== Public health ==
His initial contribution, Infant Mortality: a Social Problem, was the forerunner of many writings about public health which proved respected and influential, including: Hygiene and Public Health in 1917, Outline of the Practice of Preventative Medicine in 1919, The Rise of Preventative Medicine in 1932, and The Building of the Nation’s Health in 1939. His annual reports as the Chief Medical Officer to the Ministry of Health were eagerly awaited each year, and were widely regarded as authoritative monographs on a variety of aspects of this field.

== Professional honours ==
- Member (treasurer) of the General Medical Council (Crown nominee)
- 1911 knighted
- 1918 appointed KCB Knight Commander of the Order of the Bath
- 1930 delivered Halley Stewart Lectures
- 1932 delivered Harveian Oration
- 1935 appointed GBE Knight Grand Cross of the Order of the British Empire
- 1935 Bisset Hawkins Medal of the Royal College of Physicians
- 1935 Fothergill gold medal of the Medical Society of London.
- Honorary degrees: DSc (University of Oxford), DCL (Durham University), LLD (University of London, University of Edinburgh, McGill University, University of Toronto, University of Glasgow, and University of Leeds)
- Honorary Freeman of the Society of Apothecaries, London
- Honorary Fellow of the Royal College of Surgeons of England
- Fellow of King's College, London
- Honorary Fellow of the New York Academy of Medicine

== Publications ==
- A Century of Medicine at Padua. (1922) pbk reprint. Sagwan Press. 2018. ISBN 978-1376717068; 56 pages
- A Quaker Centenary. An address delivered at the ... centenary of Bootham School, York, etc. (1923)
- A Special Report on an Infants' Milk Depot established under the auspices of the Finsbury Social Workers' Association. (1905)
- An Outline of the Practice of Preventive Medicine. A memorandum (New edition.)(1926.)
- Bacteria. Especially as they are related to the economy of nature, to industrial processes and to the public health. [Second edition, with additional matter, including new chapters on Tropical Diseases and the Bacterial Treatment of Sewage.] (1900)
- Bacteriology and the Public Health ... Illustrated. Third edition [of “Bacteria in Relation to the Economy of Nature”] (1904)
- Bakehouses in Finsbury. A special report under the Factory and Workshop Act, 1901, Sections 97–102. (1902)
- British Medical Association, Oxford, 1904. State Medicine Section. The Control of the Milk Supply ... Reprinted from the “British Medical Journal,” etc. (pp. 24. British Medical Association: London, 1904.)
- The Building of a Nation's Health. (1939)
- Citizenship and the Survival of Civilization. (1928)
- The Commemoration of Florence Nightingale. An oration delivered ... before the general meeting of the International Council of Nurses. London, July 1937
- The disciples of Boerhaave in Edinburgh. An address delivered at the bi-centenary celebration of the foundation of the Medical Faculty in the University of Edinburgh on 11 June 1926 ... Reprinted from the Edinburgh Medical Journal, etc. (1926)
- English Social Services (1941)
- The foundations of national health. The Sir Charles Hastings lecture, 1928.
- George Fox, the Founder of Quakerism. (1924)
- Health and Social Evolution. (1931)
- The Health of the State. (1907)
- WHITELEGGE, Benjamin Arthur, Hygiene and Public Health ... New edition, revised, enlarged and in great part rewritten by George Newman. (1908)
- Infant Mortality. A social problem. (1906),
- Influenza vaccine. Instructions to medical officers of health. (1919)
- Interpreters of Nature. Essays. (1927)
- Lord Shaftesbury's Legacy to the Children of England. (1930)
- Memorandum on prevention of influenza. (1919)
- On the History of the Decline and Final Extinction of Leprosy as an endemic disease in the British Islands. (1895)
- The Place of Public Opinion in Preventive Medicine. (Lecture.) (1920)
- The Private Practitioner as Pioneer in Preventive Medicine. Being the annual oration of the Hunterian Society: 1926
- Public education in health. A memorandum addressed to the Minister of Health.(1924)
- Quaker Profiles. (1946)
- Recent advances in medical education in England. A memorandum addressed to the Minister of Health. (1923)
- Report on the Milk Supply of Finsbury, 1903 ... (1903)
- The Rise of Preventive Medicine. (1932)
- Some Notes on Adult Education in England. (1930)
- Thomas Sydenham, reformer of English medicine. (1924)
