= The Friends Quarterly =

British Quaker periodical, founded 1867

- Former editors: George Newman (1899 – c. 1939)
- Publisher: The Friend Publications Ltd.
- Founded: 1867
- First issue: January 1867
- Country: United Kingdom
- Based in: England

The Friends Quarterly, formerly known as the Friends' Quarterly Examiner (FQE), is a Quaker British periodical. Founded in 1867, it discusses a variety of issues from a Quaker perspective. It is currently published online, with digital issues available since 2022.

== History ==
The periodical was founded in 1867, and its first issue was published in January 1867. It was published under the title "The Friends' Examiner, Religious Social, and Miscellaneous Review" and sought to reach the roughly 15,000 Quakers in the U.K. with a Quaker religious perspective on events and to aid in philanthropy according to its first editor, W.C. Westlake.

The Friends Quarterly is owned by The Friend Publications Ltd., a trust which also publishes The Friend.

== Notable writers ==
- Chris Barber
- A. E. Heath
- Margaret Hobling
- Frederick Parker-Rhodes
- Ruth Morris
- Alfred William Bennett
- George Newman
- Matilda Sturge
- L. S. Bevington
- W. F. Harvey
- Thomas Hodgkin
- Cuthbert Dukes
- Francis Frith
- Charles Tylor
- John Lampen
