= Experiment with Light =

Quaker spiritual practice

Experiment with Light is a Quaker spiritual practice. It refers back to seventeenth century Quakers' experience, rediscovered as a systematic discipline in 1996.

Experiment with Light is often practised in Quaker meetings in Light groups, but it can also be undertaken as a solo discipline and it is not necessary to be a Quaker to practise it. Recordings of the different versions of the meditation are available on CD and as downloads from the Experiment with Light website. The website Experiment with Light also provides details of resources and events as well as the guided meditations. It also holds the latest online editions of the Experiment with Light Journal. There are Android or Apple apps that can be downloaded to play recordings of the meditations on a mobile phone.

== Development ==
Light to Live by describes how British Quaker Rex Ambler first became aware of seventeenth century Quaker insight and how, as a result, he devised the Experiment. Seeing Hearing Knowing: reflections on Experiment with Light is a collection of articles describing different writers' experience of it. In 2011 the Quaker weekly Journal The Friend (Quaker Magazine) ran a series of articles about it. Mind the Light: the story of a Quaker discipline details the origins and history of its development from 1996 to 2017.

In Britain there is an Experiment with Light Network, which is a Quaker Recognised Body of Britain Yearly Meeting of the Religious Society of Friends. There is a North America Experiment with Light Network and it is also practised in Quaker Meetings in Australia, South Africa, Zimbabwe, Norway, Denmark and Sweden. It can be, and is, undertaken by people who are not Quakers as well.

== Process ==
At the heart of the practice is a meditation which guides Experimenters through four core steps (although the words suggesting each step differ in the various versions):

- Mind the Light (pay attention to what the inward Light shows in the meditation);
- Open your heart to the Truth (look at the reality shown by the Light, in an attitude of receptivity);
- Wait in the Light (exercise patience, let the Light show you what is really going on, in a detached manner);
- Submit (welcome the insights and accept them).
