= George Stacey =

George Stacey may refer to:

- George Stacey (footballer)
- George Stacey (abolitionist)

== See also ==
- George Stacy, a fictional character appearing in Marvel Comics comic books
