= William Forster (philanthropist) =

English Quaker (1784–1854)

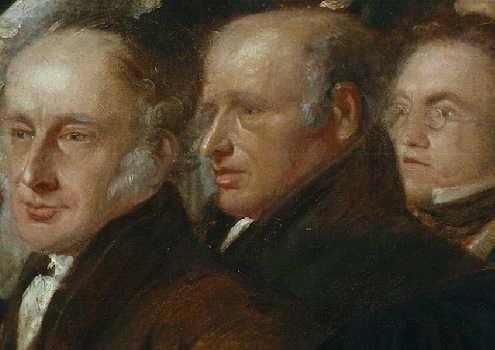
- William between two fellow abolitionists (George Stacey and William Morgan) in a detail from a painting.
- Born: March 23, 1784; Tottenham
- Died: January 27, 1854 (aged 69); Friendsville, Tennessee
- Resting place: Friendsville, Tennessee
- Occupations: Preacher and abolitionist
- Known for: Slavery abolitionist
- Spouse(s): 1.Rachel Wilson; 2.Sarah Dillworth
- Children: William Edward
- Parent(s): William Forster (1747–1824) and Elizabeth Hayward (1759–1837)
- Relatives: Josiah Forster (brother), Elizabeth Fry Sister-in-law

William Forster (23 March 1784 – 27 January 1854) was a preacher, Quaker elder and a fervent abolitionist. He was an early member of the British and Foreign Anti-Slavery Society in 1839. It was William and Stephen Grellet who introduced Elizabeth Fry to her life's work with prisons, but it was William's brother, Josiah, who accompanied Fry on her tour and inspection of prisons in France.

== Biography ==
Forster was born in 1784. He initially trained as a land agent with his mother's brother in Sheffield, but he then started to tour England and Scotland as a minister. He visited the Hebrides in 1812 and Ireland in 1813–14.

When visiting Newgate prison with Stephen Grellet, Forster was amazed at its state. He contacted Elizabeth Fry and she gathered together a group of women to help with improving prison conditions. Forster thereby alerted Elizabeth Fry to what was to be her life's work.

In 1816, Forster married Anna Buxton and they moved to Dorset. When his brother-in-law, Sir Thomas Fowell Buxton, entered parliament in 1818, he wrote to him to encourage him to take up the cause of slavery. He noted that the slavery trade had been abolished (in 1807 in the British Empire) but there was still the issue of those who were already slaves.

Doctrinal differences within the Quakers were created by the views of Elias Hicks of New York. Forster highlighted the issue in 1820. Prominent English evangelical Quakers which included Elizabeth Robson, Forster and Anna Braithwaite, decided to travel to the United States to denounce Hicks' views between 1821 and 1827.

Meanwhile, following the Reform Act, William Wilberforce was able to get anti-slavery legislation through parliament. In 1838 legislation replaced slavery with apprenticeship. As a result, in August 1838 800,000 people in the British Empire became nominally free.

A picture was commissioned showing William Forster as a member of the new British and Foreign Anti-Slavery Society which was formed in 1839 at an important international convention in June 1840. The small extract shown here includes only Samuel Gurney—a banker and fellow Quaker—Forster, and William Allen. Also in this painting are William's brothers, Robert and Josiah Forster. This new society's aim was "The universal extinction of slavery and the slave trade and the protection of the rights and interests of the enfranchised population in the British possessions and of all persons captured as slaves."

In 1842-3 a schism developed in the Society of Friends in Salem in Iowa. The difference developed over the ways that the society should support the abolition of slavery, which was still an important part of the American economy. A rival meeting house had been created and a new burial ground purchased which was separated from the older Quaker burial ground by a mere two feet of ground. Four delegates were sent from Britain: Forster, his brother Josiah, George Stacey (pictured above) and John Allen. The difference between the two groups was the level to which they should publicly oppose slavery. It was the group who most supported abolition that had created a minority group called the Abolition Friends. The group did not manage to heal the divide immediately but it was resolved by 1848.

Forster and his wife visited France in July 1845 at the invitation of the French to try to establish links with the French abolitionists. They found activity in Paris, but were disappointed to find that there was little activity in the country in general.

== Final journey ==
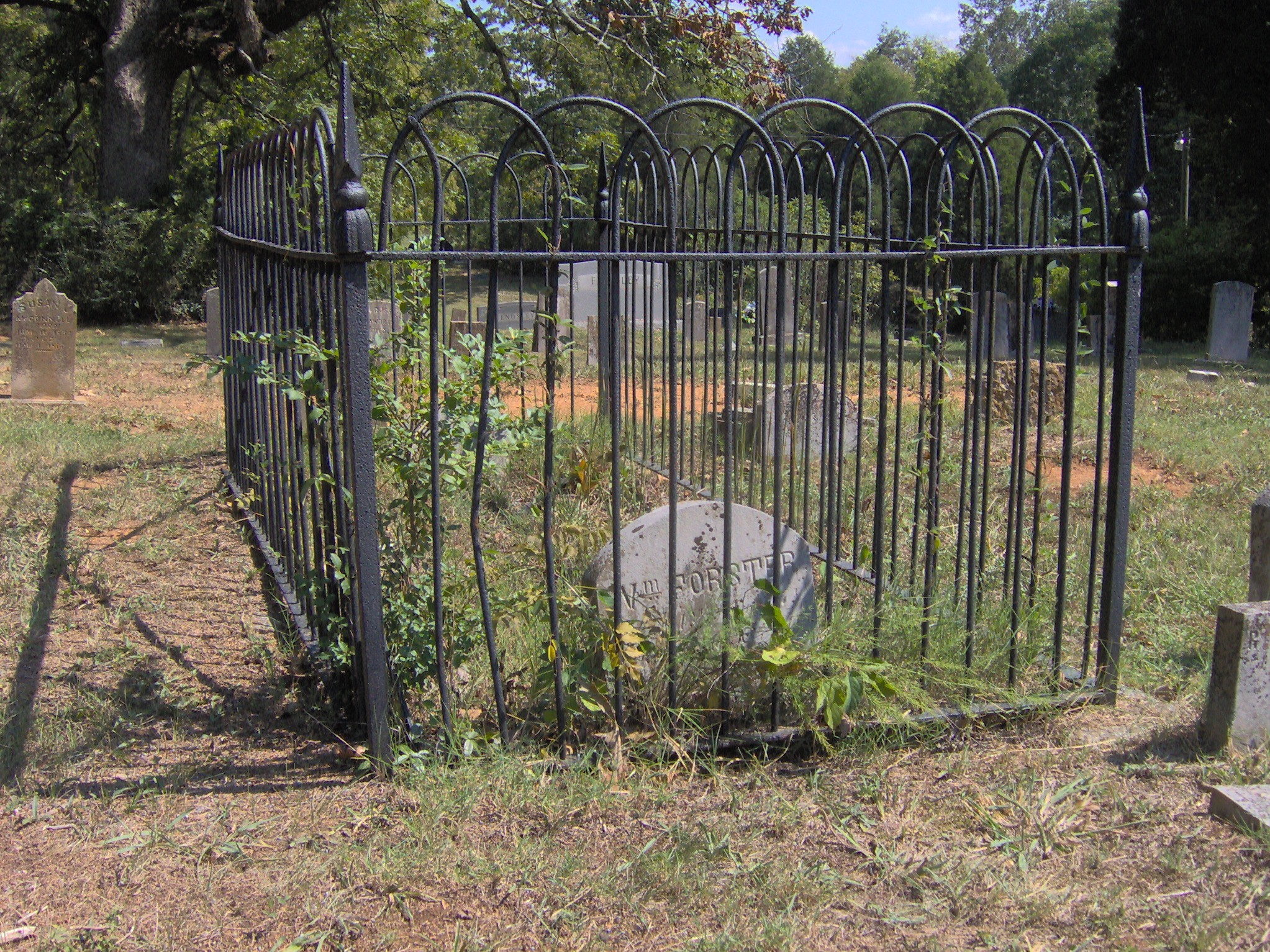
Forster's grave in 2008 behind the Friends Meeting house in Friendsville.

In 1849 the yearly meeting of the Quakers requested that Forster visit the rulers of the Christian nations. Forster visited many of the European rulers to forward the abolitionists' cause, but it was in 1853 that he and three others visited the American president, Franklin Pierce, and journeyed to spread the message to the governors of the southern American states, eventually meeting thirteen of them. It was during this journey that Forster died and was buried in the Quaker town of Friendsville in Tennessee (which was on the Underground Railroad).

The Fireside poet, John Greenleaf Whittier, wrote a poem in William's memory; on Forster's first visit to America he had visited the home of Whittier's parents. Forster's son William Edward Forster was an MP who campaigned for universal education.

== Works ==
- Memoirs of William Forster: In Two Volumes, William Forster, Benjamin Seebohn, 1865

== Sources ==
- Memoirs of the Life and Gospel Labours of Stephen Grellet, Stephen Grellet, 1862
