= Francis Frith =

English photographer (1822–1898)

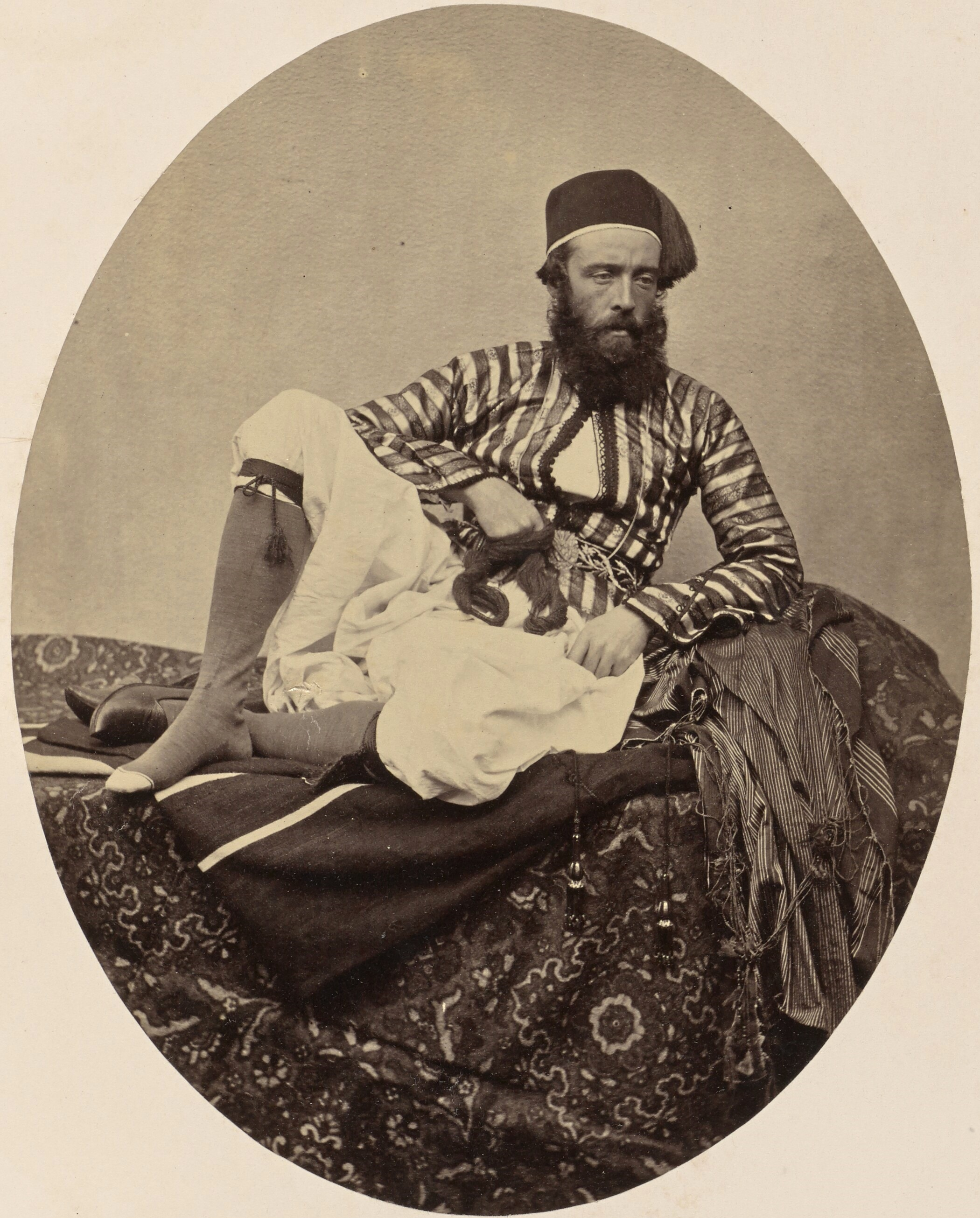
- Self-portrait in Middle Eastern costume, c. 1857
- Born: 7 October 1822; Chesterfield, Derbyshire, England, United Kingdom
- Died: 25 February 1898 (aged 75); Cannes, France
- Known for: Photographer and publisher
- Movement: Orientalist

Francis Frith (also spelled Frances Frith, 7 October 1822 – 25 February 1898) was an English photographer and businessman. Francis Frith & Co., the company he founded in 1860 with the initial goal of photographing every town and village in England, quickly became the largest photographic publishers in the world and eventually amassed a collection of 330,000 negatives covering over 7,000 population centres across Great Britain and Ireland.

Frith was born in Chesterfield, Derbyshire, attending Quaker schools at Ackworth and Quaker Camp Hill in Birmingham (c. 1828–1838), before he started in the cutlery business. He suffered a nervous breakdown in 1843, recuperating over the next two years. In 1850 he started a photographic studio in Liverpool, known as Frith & Hayward. A successful grocer, and later, printer, Frith fostered an interest in photography, becoming a founding member of the Liverpool Photographic Society in 1853. Frith sold his companies in 1855 in order to dedicate himself entirely to photography. He journeyed to the Middle East on three occasions between 1856 and 1860, taking with him three glass plate cameras, the largest of which measured 16" x 20". He used the collodion process, a major technical achievement in hot and dusty conditions.

== Early life ==
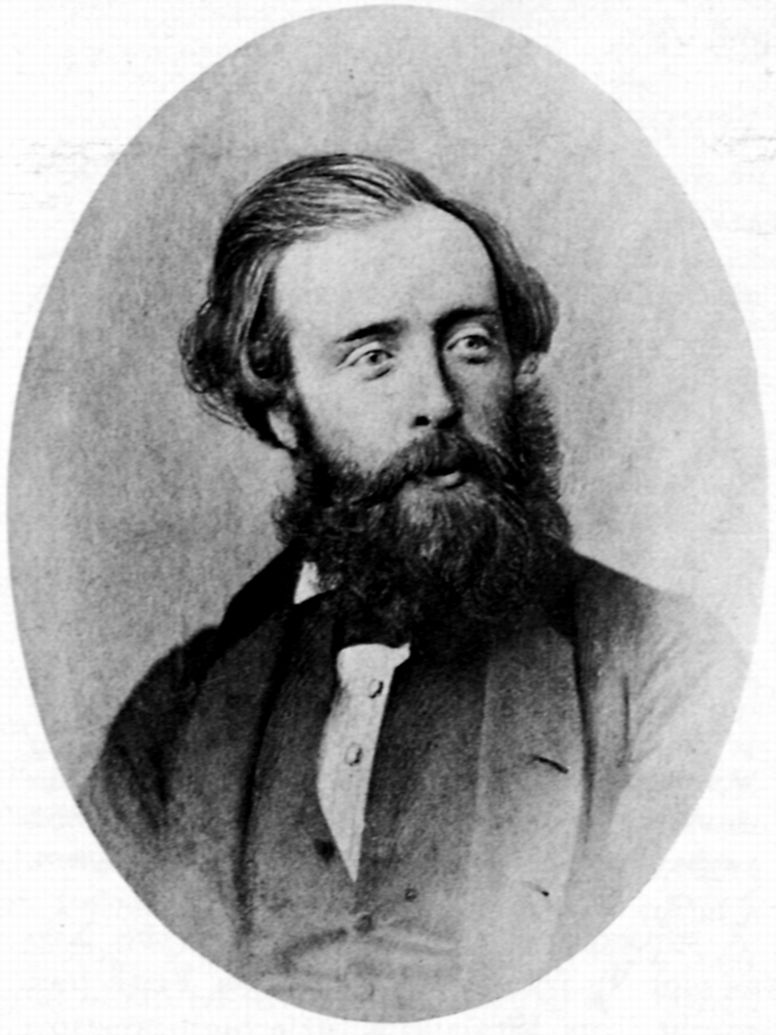
Francis Frith (after 1850)

Francis Frith Jr was born in Chesterfield, Derbyshire, the second child and only son of Francis Frith Sr and his wife Alice, née Walker. He was born into a merchant Quaker family. He was originally apprenticed in the cutlery trade, but eventually became a grocer, supplying ships at Liverpool. He appears to have learned photography sometime in the 1850s, and in 1859 was one of the founding members of the Liverpool Photographic Society.

== Travels with a camera (1856–59) ==
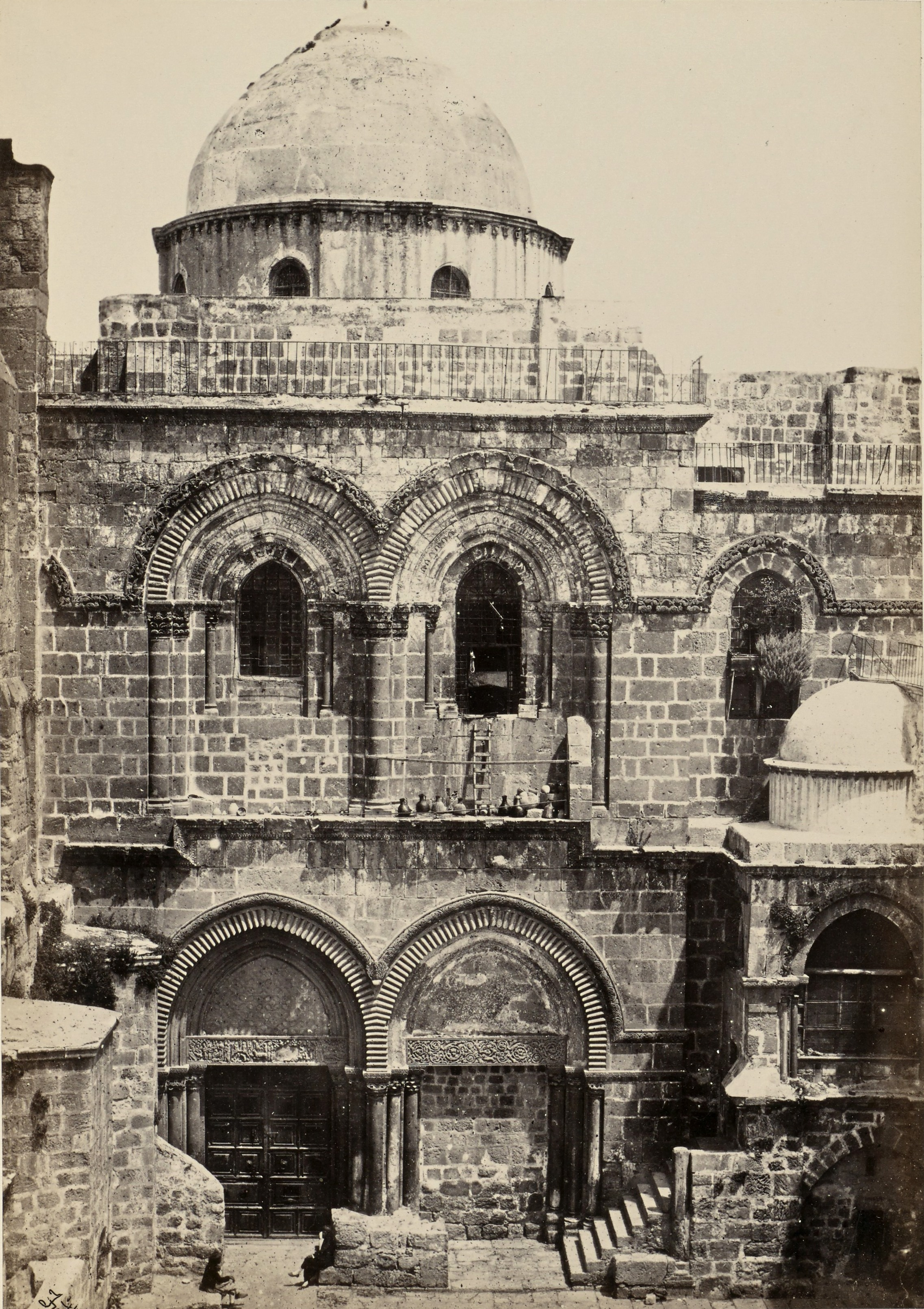
Entrance, Church of the Holy Sepulchre, Jerusalem, Gelatin silver photograph, Brooklyn Museum

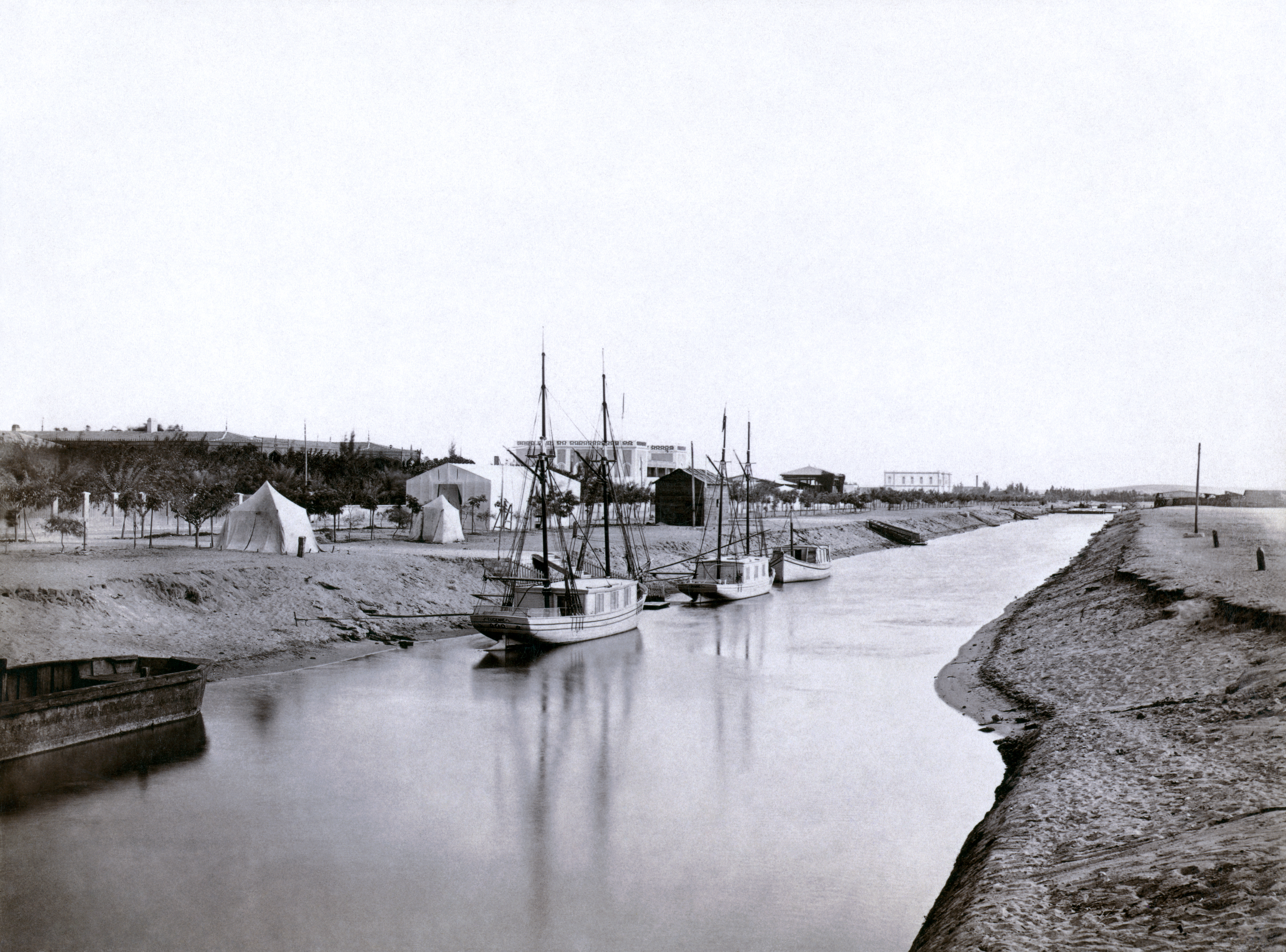
Restored albumen print of the Suez Canal at Ismailia, c. 1860

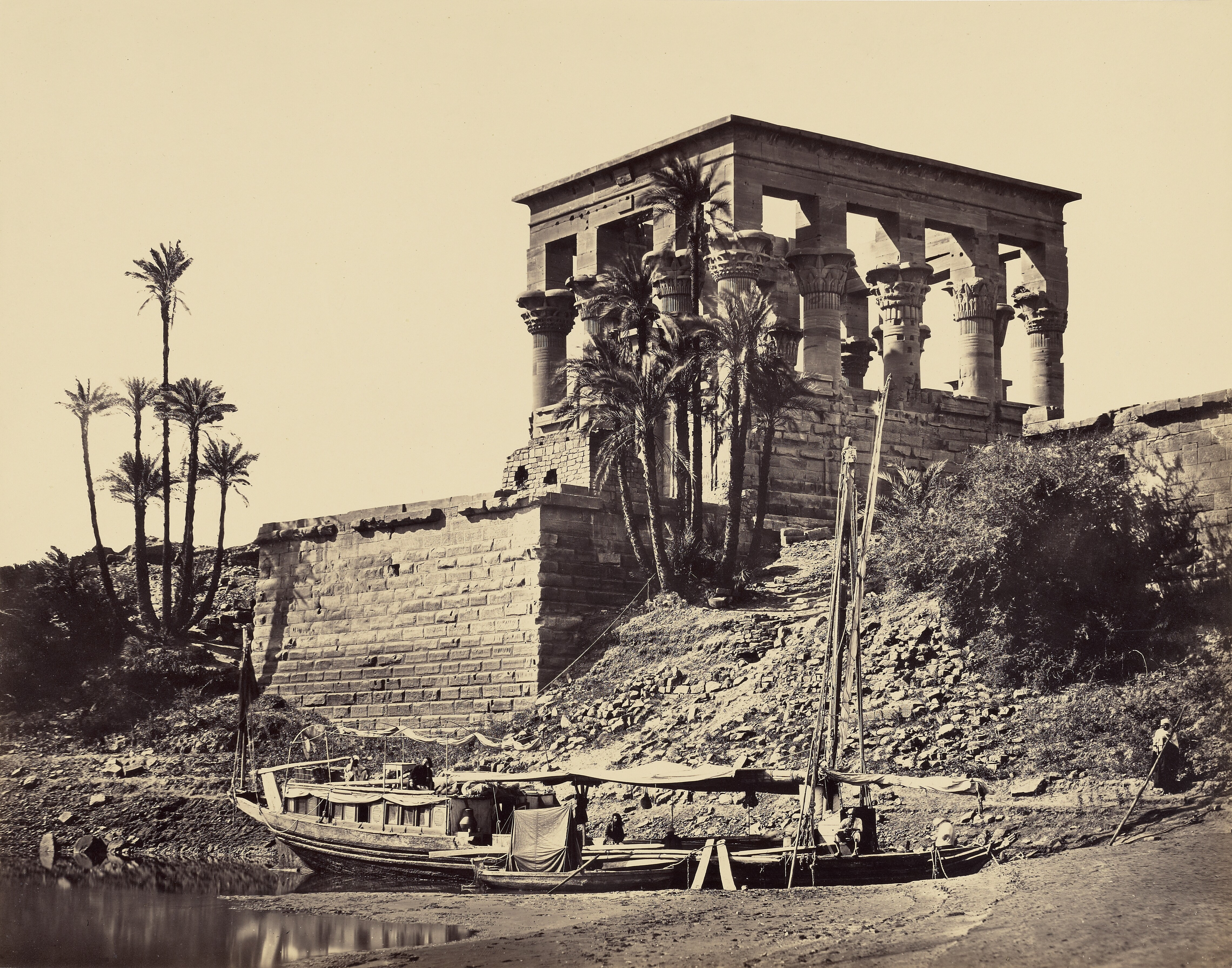
The Hypaethral Temple, Philae, by Francis Frith, 1857; from the collection of the National Galleries of Scotland

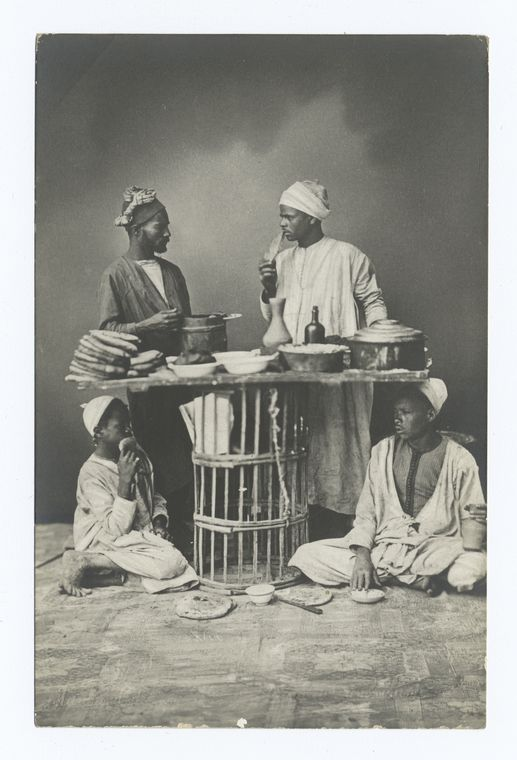
Four men and a table of food, Egypt

Frith was one of the first of a new type of entrepreneurial photographer to establish himself as a retailer of scenic photographs on a large scale. During his travels he noted that tourists were the main consumers of the views of Italy, but armchair travellers bought scenes from other parts of the world in the hope of obtaining a true record, "far beyond anything that is in the power of the most accomplished artist to transfer to his canvas." These words express the ambitious goal that Frith set for himself when he departed on his first trip to the Nile Valley in 1856 with his inventive friend Francis H. Wenham, who acted as lighting technician.

He also made two other trips before 1860, extending his photo-taking to Palestine and Syria. In addition to photography, he also kept a journal during his travels elaborating on the difficulties of the trip, commenting on the "smothering little tent" and the collodion fizzing – boiling up over the glass. Frith also noticed the compositional problems regarding the point of view from the camera. According to Frith, "the difficulty of getting a view satisfactorily in the camera: foregrounds are especially perverse; distance too near or too far; the falling away of the ground; the intervention of some brick wall or other common object... Oh what pictures we would make if we could command our point of views." An image he took known as the "Approach to Philae" is just one example which elaborates his ability to find refreshing photographic solutions to these problems. (cited from "A World History of Photography")

When not taking photographs in the Middle East, he was back in England, printing them and reproducing them in illustrated books – including his Egypt and Palestine photographed described by Francis Frith 1858–60 and Egypt, Palestine and Sinai (1860) with text by Mrs Sophia Poole and Reginald Stuart Poole - both of which became very popular.

== Francis Frith & Co. and marriage ==
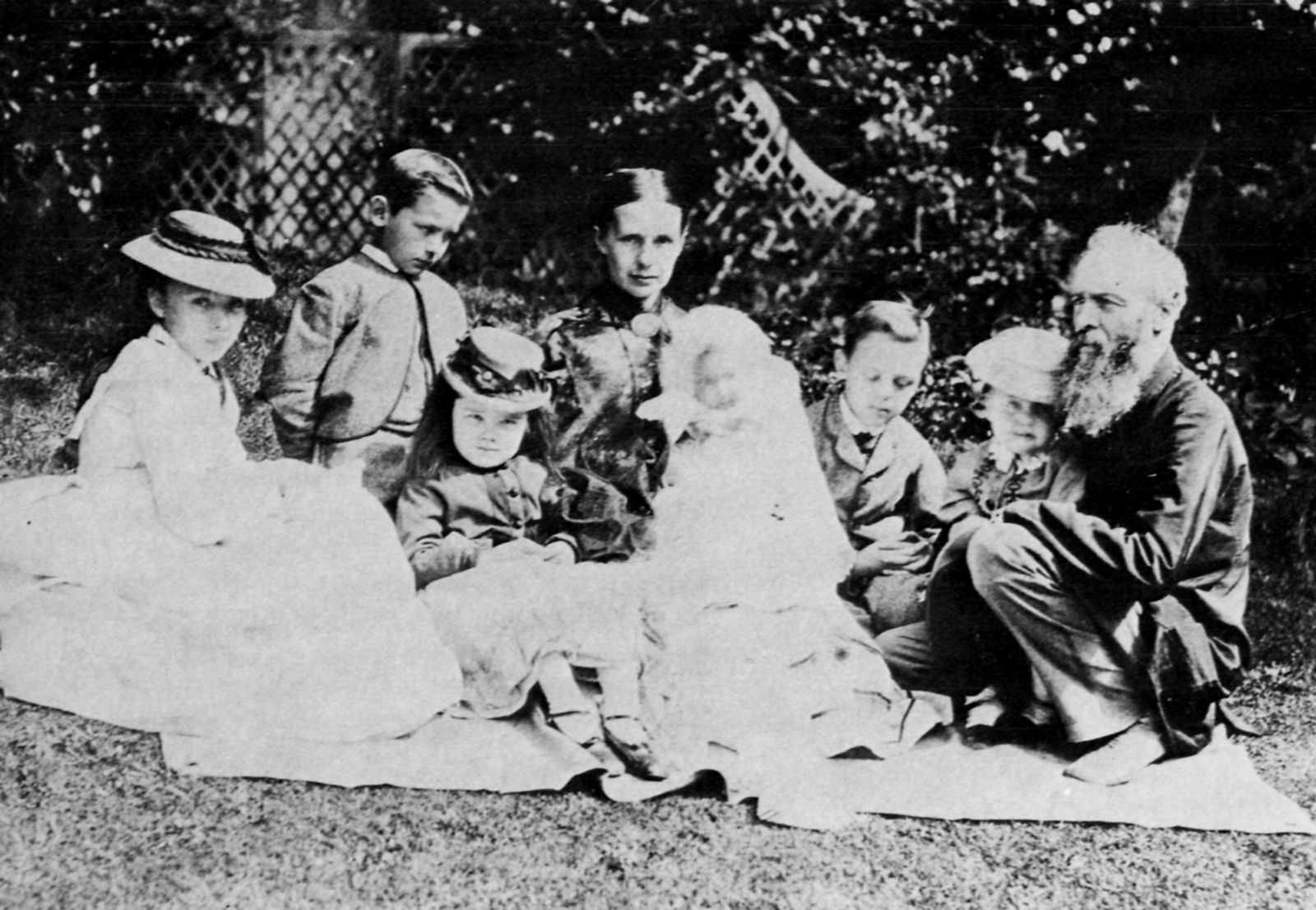
Francis Frith with the family (after 1850)

When he had finished his travels in the Middle East in 1859, he opened the firm of Francis Frith & Co. in Reigate, Surrey, as the world's first specialist photographic publisher. In 1860, he married Mary Ann Rosling (sister of Alfred Rosling, the first treasurer of the Photographic Society) and embarked upon a colossal project—to photograph every town and village in the United Kingdom; in particular, notable historical or interesting sights. Initially he took the photographs himself, but as success came, he hired people to help him and set about establishing his postcard company, a firm that became one of the largest photographic studios in the world. Within a few years, over two thousand shops throughout the United Kingdom were selling his postcards. Photographs attributed to Francis Frith & Co Ltd are held in the Conway Library of Art and Architecture at The Courtauld Institute of Art and in the National Portrait Gallery.

== Work ==
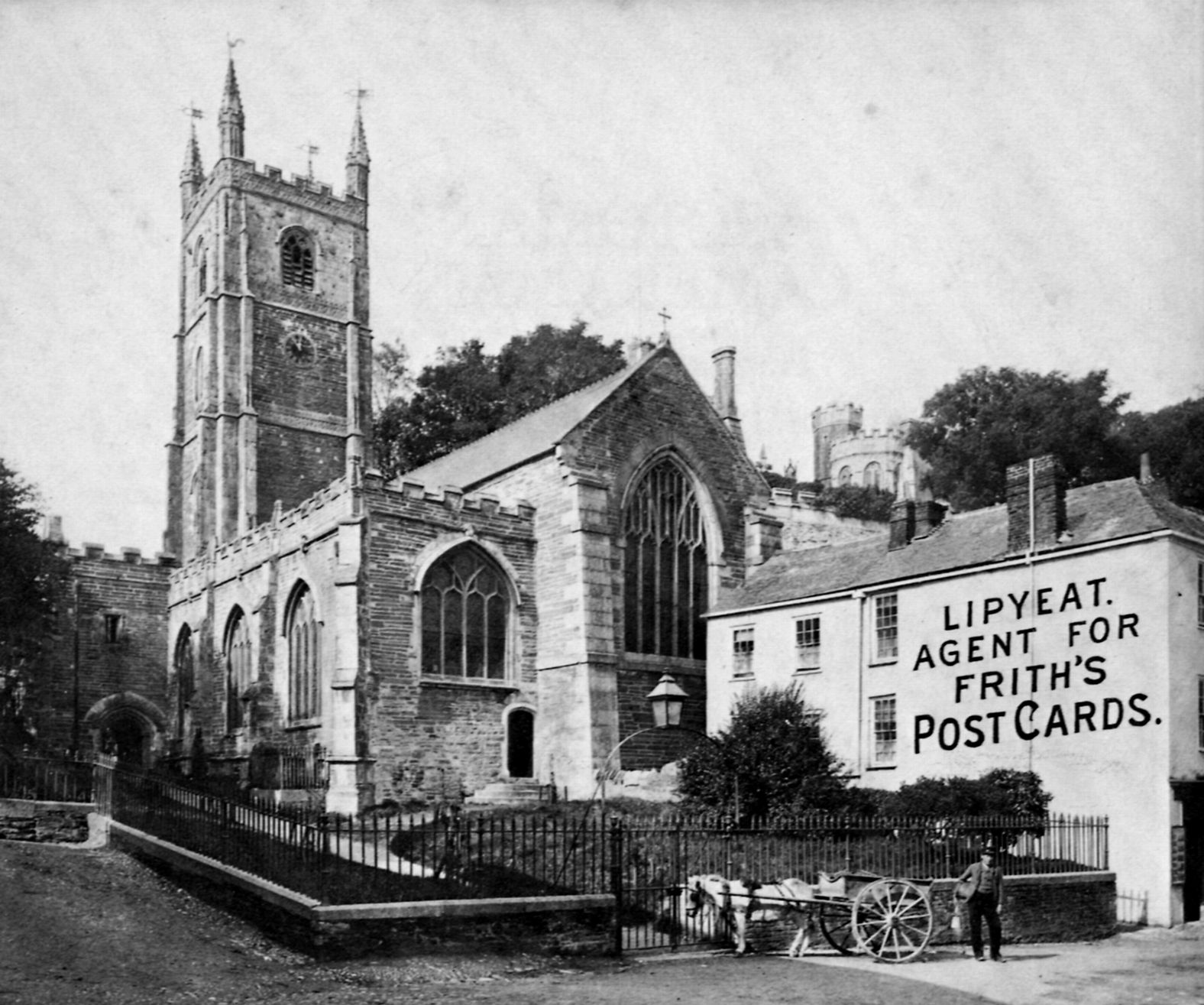
Church in Fowey and Frith postcard advert on nearby wall by Francis Frith

Many of his photographs were collected into published volumes. Initially these works were compiled by established publishing companies. However, by the 1860s, Firth realised that he could profit from publishing his own images and established the publishing company F. Frith & Co.

Select list of publications

- Egypt and Palestine, Photographed and Described by Francis Frith, 2 volumes, London, James S. Virtue, 1858–1859
- Cairo, Sinai, Jerusalem, and the Pyramids of Egypt, A Series of Sixty Photographic Views, by Francis Frith, With Descriptions by Mrs. Sophia Lane Poole and Reginald Stuart Poole, London, James S. Virtue, n.d. (1860)
- Egypt, Palestine and Nubia, 4 volumes, by Francis Frith, London + Glasgow + Edinburgh, William MacKenzie, 1862
- Egypt, Nubia and Ethiopia, Illustrated by One Hundred Stereoscopic Photographs Taken by Francis Frith for Messrs. Negretti and Zambra, With Descriptions and Numerous Wood Engravings by Joseph Bonomi, and Notes by Samuel Sharpe London, Smith, Elder and Co., 1862
- The Gossiping Photographer at Hastings, Reigate 1864
- The Gossiping Photographer on the Rhine, Reigate 1864

== Quaker ==
Frith was "recorded" as a Quaker minister in 1872 (at this time there only some 250 recorded ministers in England and Wales). He served on numerous committees, and frequently spoke in favour of pacifism and abstinence. He was an occasional contributor of philosophical and religious articles and poems to the Quaker journal, the Friends' Quarterly Examiner.

In his sixties, Frith positioned himself at the extreme liberal wing of society. In 1884, he published (with William Pollard and William Turner) A Reasonable Faith, a highly controversial pamphlet which challenged evangelical orthodoxy by questioning the factuality of the Bible. Although the liberal views expressed in A Reasonable Faith were quickly and vociferously attacked by leading evangelical Quakers, liberal theology rapidly gained support and within ten years became the majority view. Thus it was Francis Frith and his co-authors who began the liberalisation of the Quaker movement and paved the way for the philanthropic and educational reforms for which the movement is well known today.

== Personal life ==
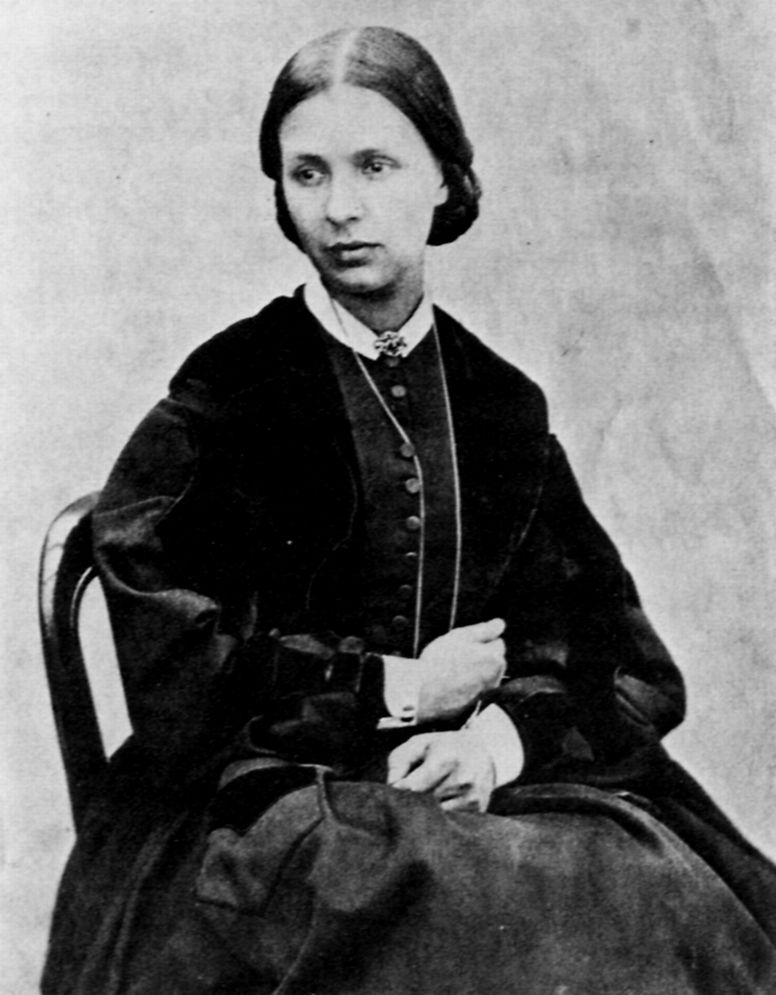
Mary Ann Frith

Frith married Mary Ann Rosling, and they had five children: Mary Alice, Eustace, Francis Edgar, Mabel and Cyril.

== Death ==
Frith died at his villa in Cannes, France, on 25 February 1898, aged 75.

== Francis Frith & Co. continues ==
His family continued the firm, which was finally closed in 1971. Following closure of the business, Bill Jay, one of Britain's first photography historians, identified the archive as being nationally important, and "at risk". Jay managed to persuade McCann-Erikson the London advertising agency to approach their client Rothmans of Pall Mall on 14 December 1971 to purchase the archive to ensure its safety. Rothmans went ahead and acquired the archive within weeks.

Frith was re-launched in 1975 as "The Francis Frith Collection" by John Buck, a Rothmans executive, with the intention of making the Frith photographs available to as wide an audience as possible.

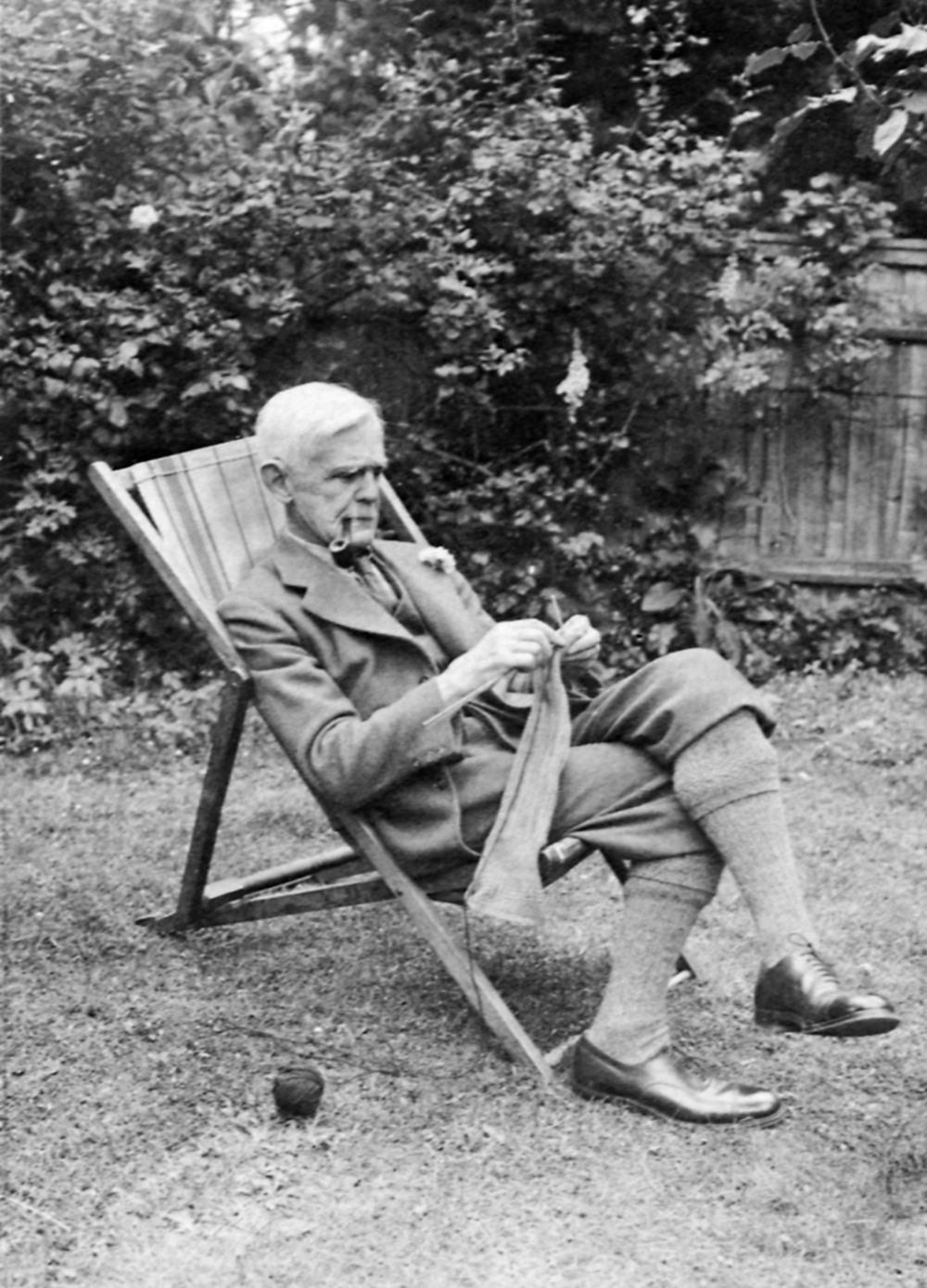
Francis Frith, portrait in old age

On 25 August 1977, Buck bought the archive from Rothmans, and has run it as an independent business since that time – trading as The Francis Frith Collection. In 2016 the company completed a two-year project to scan the entire archive and now holds over 330,000 high resolution digital images. The company website enables visitors to browse all 330,000 Frith photographs, depicting some 7,000 cities, towns and villages.

== Britain's First Photo Album ==
The ten-part BBC series Britain's First Photo Album, presented by John Sergeant, was first shown on BBC2 in March 2012 and takes a look at the history of Francis Frith's pioneering photographic work.

A 320-page book also entitled Britain's First Photo Album has been published.

== See also ==
- List of Orientalist artists
- Orientalism
- Photochrom
