= Henry Stanley Newman =

English grocer, philanthropist and author (1837–1912)

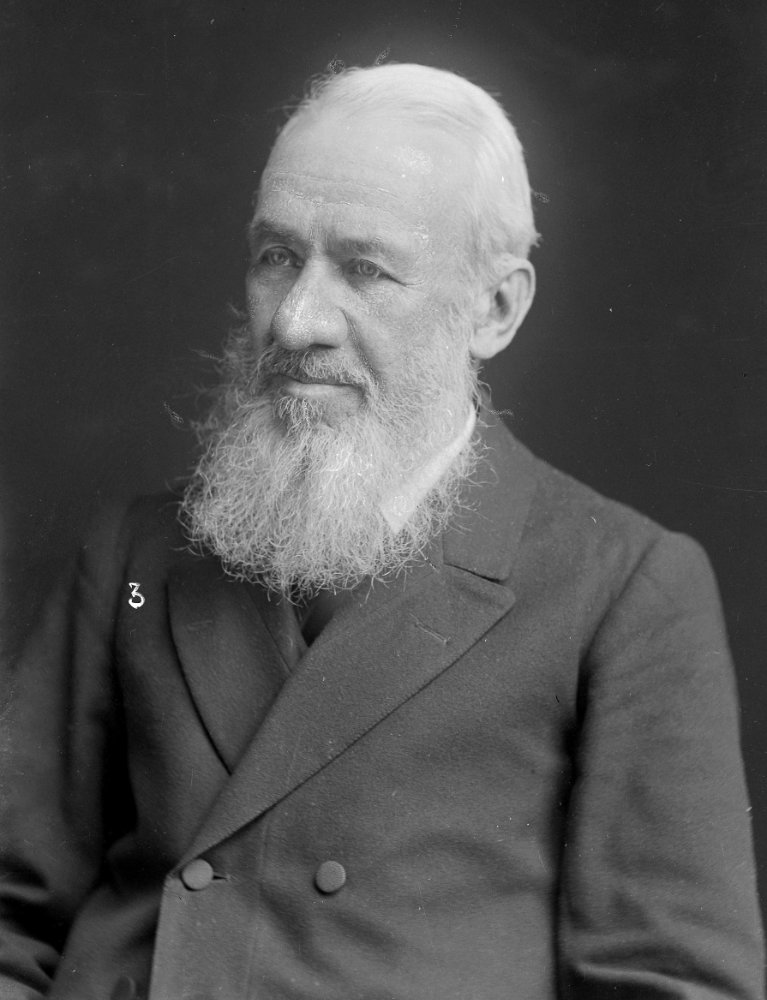
- Born: 25 April 1837; Liverpool, England
- Died: 23 October 1912 (aged 75); Leominster, England
- Occupations: Grocer; philanthropist; author
- Spouse: Mary Anna Pumphrey (m. 1863–1908)
- Children: 6

Henry Stanley Newman (25 April 1837 – 23 October 1912) was an English grocer, Quaker philanthropist, and author. He founded Leominster Orphan Homes, was active in the Religious Society of Friends, and edited The Friend publication for 20 years.

== Early life ==
Henry Stanley Newman was the first child and only son of Josiah Newman, grocer, and Harriett Wood, daughter of a Liverpool tea dealer. Born in Liverpool, he moved to Deptford and then New Cross in London, as his parents' business failed, and then to Cirencester in 1842, where they began to prosper. Newman attended Bootham School, York 1848-1852 where he became friends with boys from other notable Quaker families. Harriett died in 1851 shortly after giving birth to her fourth daughter. Josiah moved the family to Leominster in 1852 to take over the running of his father's grocery business, Newman and Son, in the same year that Newman was apprenticed to the Quaker firm of Isaac Gray Bass in Brighton. Despite a growing interest in public education, he returned to the family business in Leominster in 1858 and continued to live in the Herefordshire market town until his death in 1912.

== Career and achievements ==
Newman became a key figure in the local Quaker Meeting, travelling and preaching throughout Herefordshire, Radnorshire and beyond, and attracting new members and attendees to the Society of Friends. Membership doubled in the decade 1872-82. The Newmans were also responsible for establishing and sustaining a series of linked philanthropic enterprises aimed at improving social conditions, education and well-being in Leominster. They were practical philanthropists, taking immediate action when they saw the need, and trusting to the generosity of Friends and well-wishers to keep things going. In 1858 he began teaching the adult school that his father and uncle established in a storeroom behind the shop, later moving it to larger premises as membership grew to over 200. A year later he formed the Leominster Tract Association to publish short, simple stories on religious and moral themes to appeal to working people.

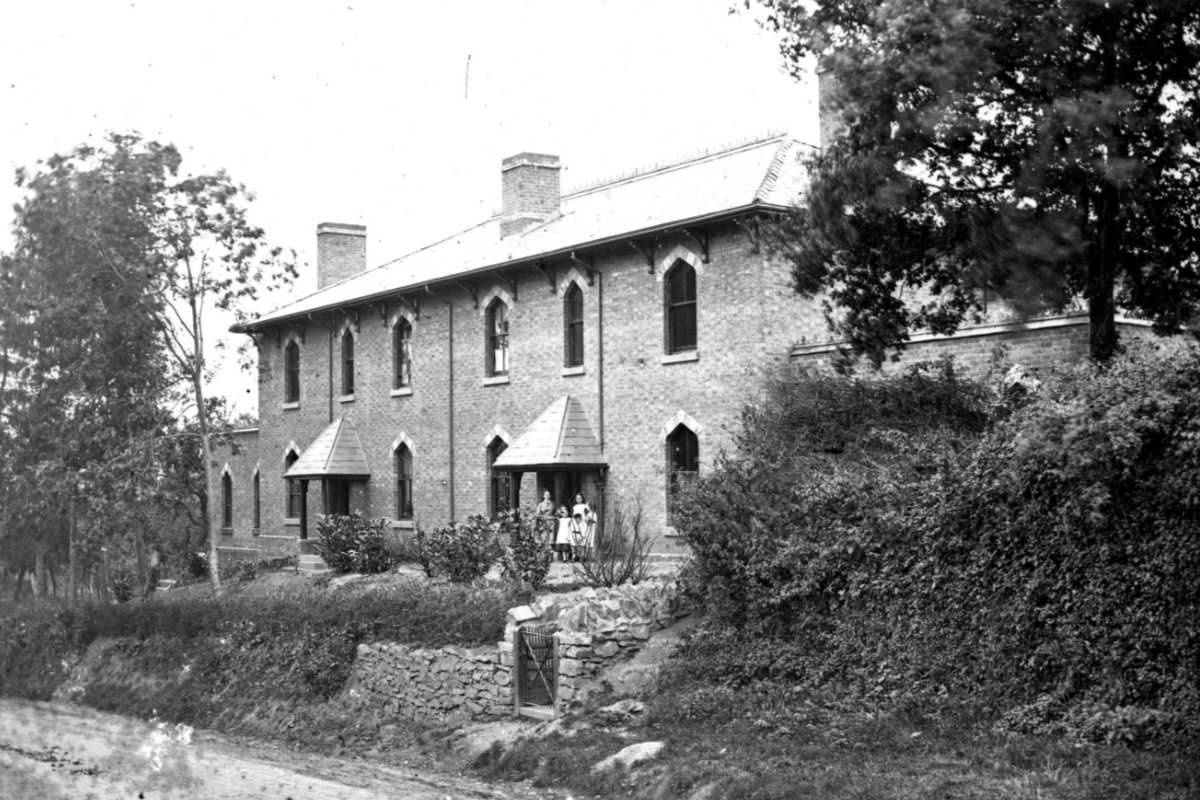
Leominster Orphan Homes

He opened the Leominster Orphan Homes in rented premises in 1869, then in 1872 raised the capital to build a pair of new homes with a garden and orchard to accommodate forty children in a healthy and caring environment. After a visit to Germany to study industrial training schemes in 1872, he set up the Orphans' Printing Press, again in the storeroom, specifically to provide training and enhance the employment prospects of boys in the Orphan Homes, and also as a sustainable income to help fund the Homes. The Press printed hundreds of thousands of leaflets for the Tract Association, teaching materials and books for adult schools and the profits went to support the Orphan Homes. Although Henry Stanley Newman continued to be involved personally in the management and operation of the Orphan Homes and Orphans' Press until his death, a Trust Deed was completed and enrolled in Chancery in 1874, Trustees appointed and the deeds of the properties passed to it. The Trustees were all eminent Quakers linked to the Newmans by birth or marriage and included George Cadbury, Thomas Barrow and Theodore Neild. He was made a County Magistrate in 1893, the same year his son Josiah left Leominster and Newman bought back the grocery business and relaunched it as Newman and Co with fellow Quaker Hubert Reynolds. The business was sold to Reynolds after Newman's death in 1912.

Newman also played an increasingly significant role in the Quakers nationally, one of a younger generation of more outward looking and evangelical Quakers. He was instrumental in the establishment of the Friends Foreign Mission Association in 1868, was its secretary until 1912, and visited and wrote about missions in India, Africa, Palestine, and North America. He was actively involved in the campaign to end slavery in East Africa and provide former slaves with training and education. He travelled the country speaking at public meetings, many of them outdoors, and wrote hundreds of letters in support of temperance and changes to the licensing laws.

In 1891 Newman became editor of The Friend when it changed from being monthly to weekly, and moved printing to the Orphans' Press. Not only did he teach the men's class at Leominster Adult School for 50 years, he also addressed national conferences on adult education, organised university extension lectures in Leominster, wrote and published many books and pamphlets on education, mission work and Quaker beliefs.

Mary Anna Newman was both wife and partner to her husband in all his undertakings, travelling with him to Palestine and America, taking his class at adult school when he was absent from Leominster, deputising for the matrons at the Orphan Homes, and providing hospitality to visiting Friends and missionaries. When she suffered a paralytic stroke in 1904, Newman reduced his commitments to spend more time with her, and her death in 1908 was a severe blow. Newman gave his last public speech in 1911 at the Friends Conference in York and died at home in 1912.

== Personal life ==
Newman married Mary Anna, the sister of his friend Stanley Pumphrey of Worcester, in 1863, adopting the second name Stanley to honour his brother-in-law and to distinguish himself from his uncle Henry Newman.

They lived above the shop in Broad Street, Leominster, and there raised a family of six children, two of whom died of consumption in their late teens. The house became a hub for Quaker activities in the town, for visiting Friends and those in difficulty, and their storeroom became first a schoolroom, then a printshop. Their children took part in all their philanthropic activities.

Like his uncle Edward Newman, Henry Stanley shared the Newman family interest in natural history and enjoyed Sunday afternoon country walks and tending his fernery. When their oldest son Josiah married and took over the grocery business in 1891, Newman, his wife, and youngest daughter Caroline moved to Buckfield, Leominster, the house his father had built on the outskirts of Leominster. Josiah was the only one of his four surviving children to have a child, Elsie Winifred, who married but died childless. His oldest daughter Harriet became superintendent of the Greenwood Industrial School, Halstead. His second son George Newman trained as a doctor, becoming the first Chief Medical Officer to the Ministry of Health.

== Published works ==
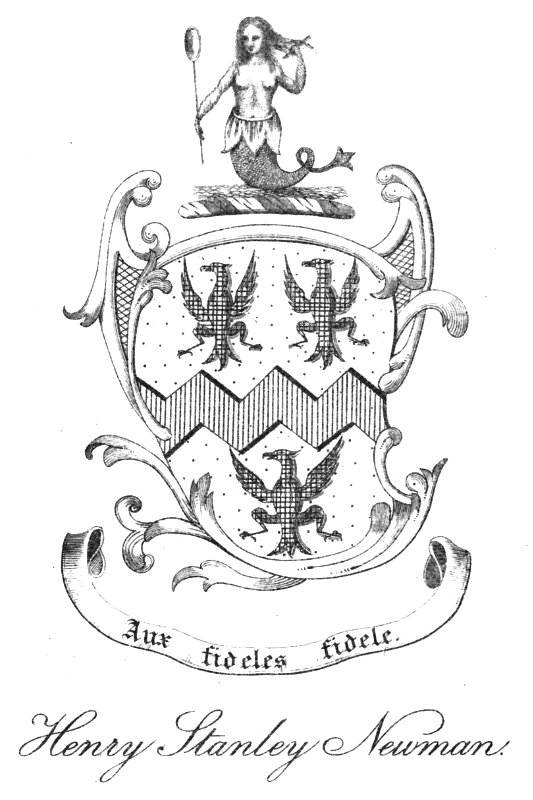
Newman's book plate

- Foreign Missions Reviewed. Friends Missionary Society 1865
- A Narrative of the Ancient Monastery of Leominster & the Church of the Nuns. The Orphans' Printing Press1870
- Days of Grace in India: a record of visits to Indian Missions. S W Partridge 1882
- The Young Man of God. Memories of Stanley Pumphrey. S W Partridge 1882
- What I Saw in India. London Partridge & Co 1885
- Herefordshire Friends in the Olden Time. Orphans' Printing Press 1885
- The Autobiography of George Fox: from his journal. London Partridge & Co 1886
- The Story of the Orphans' Homes. Orphans' Printing Press
- Christian Solidarity. Partridge & Co 1888
- Palestine Lessons to my Class. Partridge & Co 1888
- The Friends. An Explanation of their Tenets. Orphans' Printing Press 1890
- A Harvest of the Sea for Ireland. Orphan's Printing Press 1896
- Banani: The transition from Slavery to Freedom in Zanzibar. Headley Bros 1898
