= John Burnet (abolitionist) =

British abolitionist

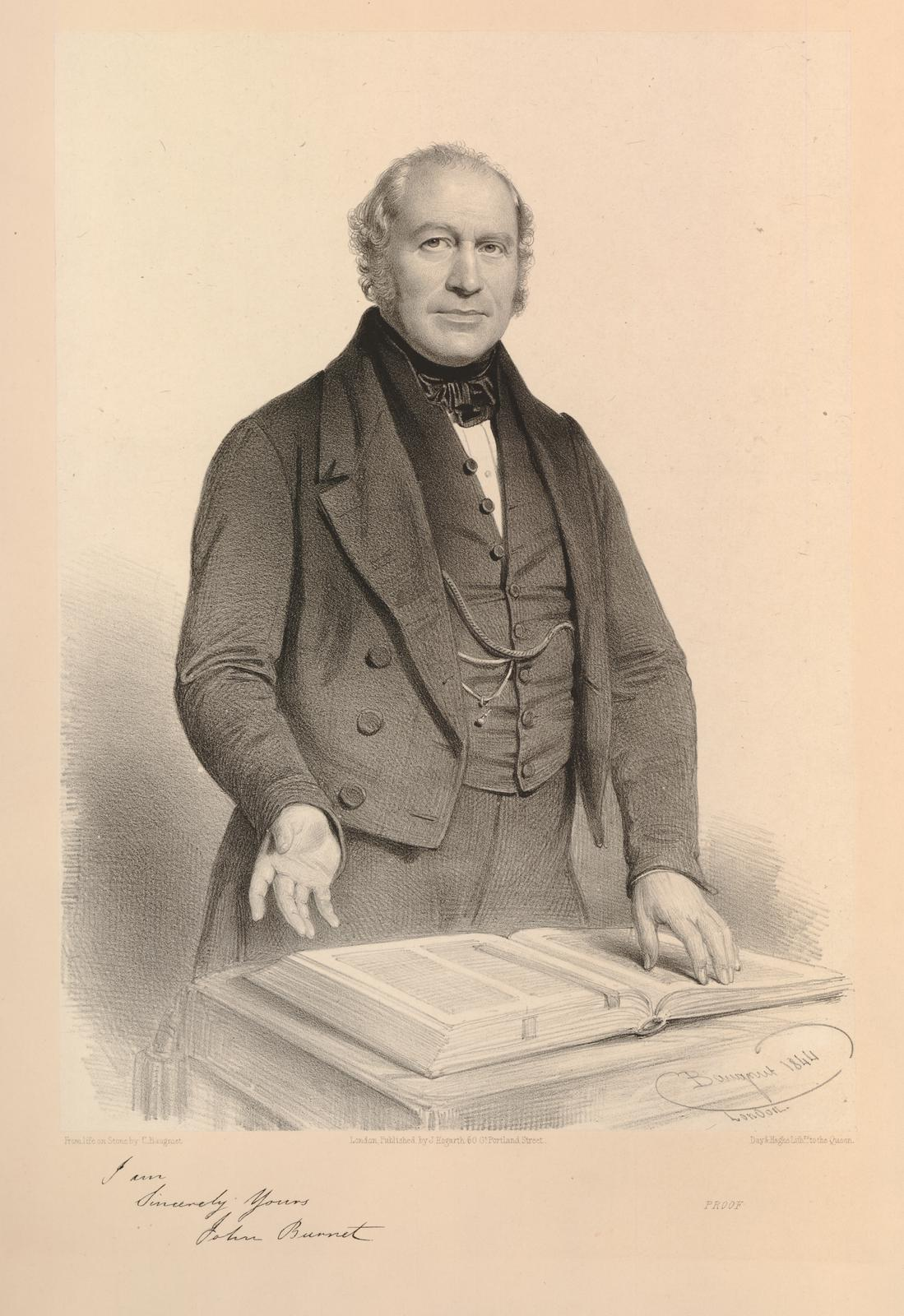
- Born: 1789; Perth, Scotland
- Died: 1862 (aged 72–73); London, England

John Burnet (1789–1862) was a pastor in Cork in Ireland before taking up the same position at the Mansion House Chapel in Camberwell. He was a well-known "platform speaker" speaking human rights issues, particularly at Exeter Hall. He was a leading member of both Congregational Union of England and the Bible Society.

== Biography ==
Burnet was born in Perth in 1789 and originally joined the army before becoming a pastor to an independent congregation in Cork in Ireland. A neat Grecian chapel was raised in George Street in Cork due to his efforts.

He came to England and took up a position as pastor to another Independent congregation at the Mansion House Chapel in Camberwell. He was a leading member of both the Congregational Union of England and the Bible Society, Peace Society the Liberation of Religion from State Control Society the Society for the Abolition of Capital Punishments

Burnet was not known for his preaching, but more as an orator and speaker on platforms like Exeter Hall. He spoke against the Corn Laws and for Anti-Slavery. On 19 March 1838, Burnet was with Peter Clare, Rev. W.N. Bunting; William Dilworth Crewdson when they presented a petition to Queen Victoria signed by 28,386 females of Manchester and Salford who requested freedom for the negro apprentices in the British Colonies. (A similar petition was presented by Lord Brougham, Joseph Sturge, Captain Hansard RN and the Reverend Thomas Scales based on resolutions passed at meetings at Exeter Hall of "friends of the negro".).

He attended the 1840 World Anti-Slavery Convention where he was one of the first people to speak in a debate to decide whether women could be admitted as delegates. He advised the American women who had travelled 3,000 miles to be there that they should withdraw. He said that "It is better that this Convention should be dissolved at this moment than this motion should be adopted." George Bradburn from Massachusetts challenged Burnet's opinion noting that he had not mentioned that the women delegates were the democratic representatives of many Americans. Burnet also attended the 1843 Anti-Slavery convention and spoke at the Freemasons Hall concerning anti-slavery. A less than generous account was given at the time of one of his speeches By Daniel Clarke Eddy:

an old man whom I understood to be Rev. John Burnet after introducing himself in some incoherent and inconsistent remarks turned round and began to address himself to this negro. He congratulated him upon the fact that he was no copper colour half and half man I use his very words, but a real jet black. Thus applauding him he shook him by the hand and flung up his arms and cried, "England and Africa forever." No child who had received a new toy could be more pleased than was this aged minister in having a negro to pet and flatter.

It was said that his supporters considered putting him forward for parliament but these did not come to fruition.

He died at Grove Lane, Camberwell, and was buried at West Norwood Cemetery.
