= The Family Friend (magazine) =

Defunct British women magazine

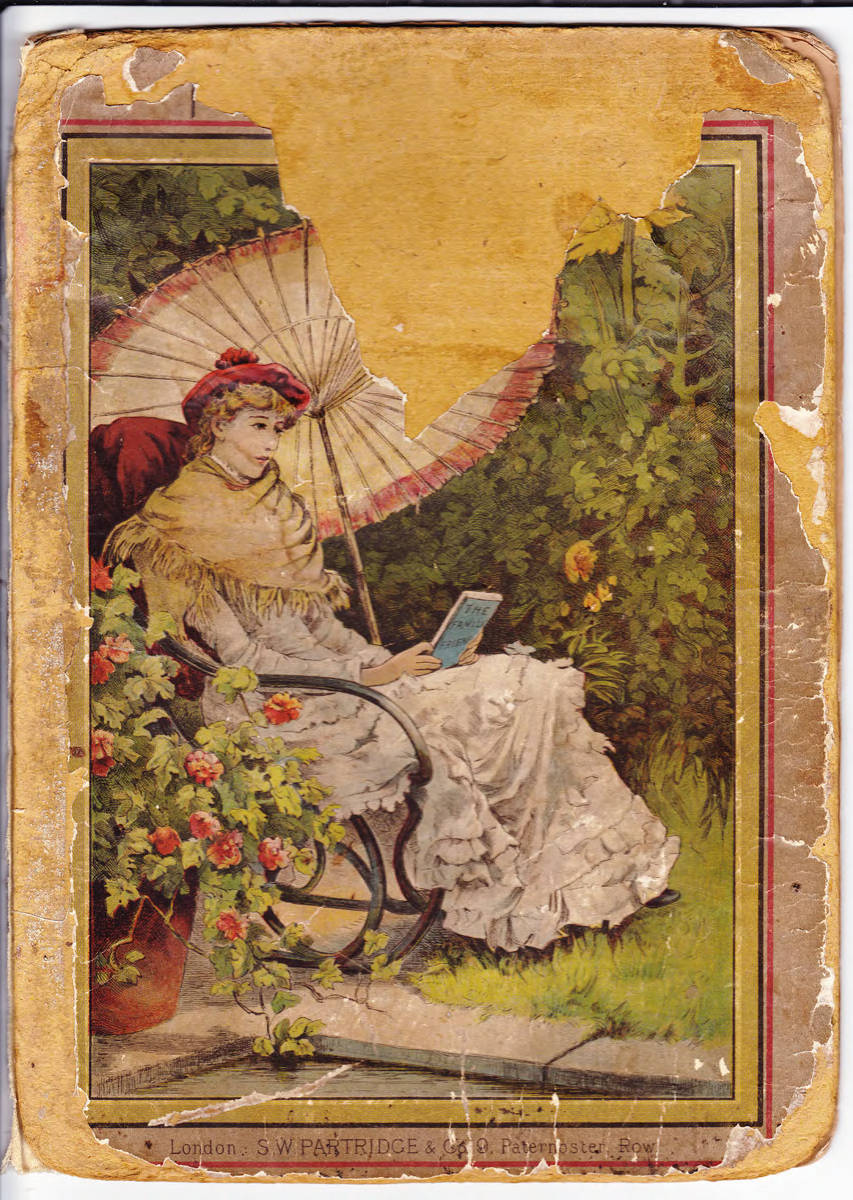
- The Family Friend from 1887
- Frequency: Monthly
- First issue: 1849
- Final issue: 1921
- Country: UK
- OCLC: 173383767

The Family Friend was a magazine published in book form in England for much of the 19th century. It was a compendium of articles considered entertaining and useful, and was aimed mainly at the housewife of the day.

== Content ==
Included were articles on cooking, diet, lacemaking, patterns, embroidery, scientific discoveries, the latest explorations of the world, advice on planting and maintaining trees and vegetables, breeding birds and animals, household tips, parenting advice, spiritual reflections and dramatic fiction. The format was varied as well, presenting prose, song, poetry, clothing patterns, and sundry other items of interest.

The advice on diet and medicine was a mixture of the sound and the completely inaccurate. One of the more popular features was the inclusion of serialized novels, most of which concerned women and were essentially morality tales. One such was 'Katharine, a Tale of Women's Trials,' by Mrs Burbury (no, 1, vol 7, 1854). Also popular were sentimental poems accompanied by engravings, often of ruined abbeys and castles. The Family Friend gives insight into the general tone of Victorian households' interests and activities, and is an accurate source for authors and filmmakers of costume design and other period details.

== Duration and circulation ==
The Family Friend was published every month by S. W. Partridge and Company of London, from 1849 to 1921. At its height, this magazine had a circulation of about 50,000.

== See also ==
- The Friend (Quaker magazine published in London since 1843)
