= George Stacey (abolitionist) =

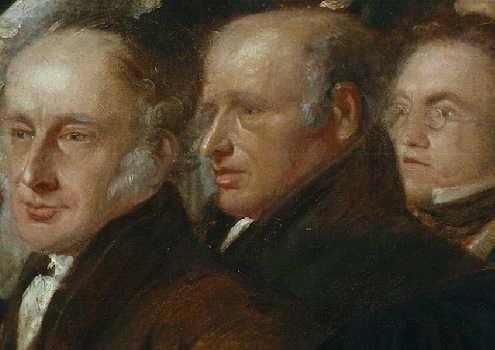
- from left:Stacey, William Forster and William Morgan in a detail from an 1840 painting.
- Born: 1787; Kendal
- Died: 1857 (aged 69–70)
- Occupation: Business
- Known for: Abolitionist
- Spouse: Deborah Lloyd

George Stacey (1787–1857) was a leading English Quaker and abolitionist. He was active in trying to prevent a schism within the Quakers.

== Biography ==
Stacey was born in Kendal.

Stacey married a fellow Quaker and cousin, Deborah Lloyd, of the Lloyds banking family. Stacey was then living in Tottenham. He was a business partner in a Chemists business called Corbyn, Beaumont, Stacey and Messer. The Stacey's involvement in this partnership dated from 1772 when Thomas Corbyn took in another George Stacey; who were both Quakers. That George Stacey died in 1816.

In 1823 the Anti-Slavery Society was formed with Stacey as a leading member. The society had many Quaker members and Stacey was also joining his fellow Quakers in business ventures like the Stockton and Darlington Railway in 1825.

Between 1830 and 1850 he was chosen twelve times as the clerk to the influential yearly meeting of the Quakers in London. This may in part be due to Stacey's method of speaking. Stephen Grellet, the French Quaker reported that Stacey said that he would express his views as clearly as he could once, but would not repeat them as this was unlikely to convince others who did not agree. The Quakers as a whole were committed to ending slavery and Stacey was a leading figure in this endeavour. His business dealt with America and the West Indies and this involvement must have been more than theoretical.

Stacey is in the left foreground of this painting of the 1840 Anti-Slavery Convention. There are dozens of women shown in the very far background. Move your cursor to identify him or click the icon to enlarge

During the 1840 World Anti-Slavery Convention there was a disagreement with the American convention who had taken literally the instruction to send delegates. The British organising committee were surprised to find there were female delegates asking to sit in the main hall. It was Stacey who was called on to address the issue on behalf of the organising committee. Stacey noted that the women were valued in the work that they did, but that the committee felt that women were not normally included unless their contribution was essential. The women from America, and England, were asked to sit away from the main area. The commemorative painting of the event shows Stacey in the important foreground of the painting and women with the exception of the main speakers daughter, Mary Clarkson, the women are huddled to the right and to the back of the assembled crowd.

Stacey was trying to deal with a difficult issue and Rachel Stacey did take a leading role as secretary of the London Ladies' Negro Friend Society, but it was said that the 1840 Anti-Slavery Convention laid the foundations for later fights for the rights of women.

In 1841, Forster's wife Dorothy died.

In 1842-3 a schism developed in the Society of Friends in Salem in Iowa over the ways that the society should support slavery, which was still an important part of the American economy. A rival meeting house had been created, and a separate burial ground which was separated from the older Quaker burial ground by a mere two feet of space. Four delegates were sent from Britain: Stacey, Josiah Forster, his brother William and John Allen. The group did not manage to heal the divide immediately but it was resolved by 1848.
