= The Friend (Quaker magazine) =

Quaker magazine founded in 1843

- The Friend from 1901
- Editor: Joseph Jones
- Categories: Quaker magazine
- Frequency: Weekly
- Founded: 1843
- Company: The Friend Publications Ltd (a registered charity)
- Country: UK
- Based in: London
- ISSN: 0016-1268

The Friend is a weekly Quaker magazine published in London, UK. It is the only Quaker weekly in the world, and has been published continuously since 1843. It began as a monthly and in January 1892 became a weekly. It is one of the oldest continuously published publications in the world still in operation. Others (e.g. Punch) which began publication before The Friend have had lengthy interruptions in publication and/or have closed down.

== Independence ==
The Friend is completely independent from Britain Yearly Meeting, although since 2004 it has occupied space in Friends House. It is owned by The Friend Publications Ltd., a trust which also publishes Friends Quarterly. The Trustees of The Friend are appointed from members of Britain Yearly Meeting.

The Trustees appoint the Editor who, along with the other members of staff, is entirely responsible for the day-to-day management of the magazine, and its content. Among the initial trustees were Josiah Forster, George Stacey, John Hodgkin.

== Editorial policy ==
As an independent publication, The Friend is free to report critically on trends within Quakerism in Britain and around the world, and on the governance of Britain Yearly Meeting. It also reports on the activities of Friends and Friends' groups and it is a forum for theological debate. There is a great deal of opinion in the magazine, and the letters page provides a forum for readers to express their views.

One of the ways The Friend exercises its responsibility to give readers an independent viewpoint is by covering Meeting for Sufferings, the standing consultative body of Britain Yearly Meeting, which meets five times a year. Meeting for Sufferings often deals with controversial issues, on which The Friend reports and comments.

== The Friend Online ==
In recent years, The Friend has begun offering all its content online to subscribers. It is intended to make the issues for the period 1914 to 1918 available as a digital archive.

== The printing of The Friend ==
For many years, The Friend was printed by an old Quaker firm, Headley Brothers, of Ashford, Kent. Headley Brothers went into administration in 2017. From 23 June 2017 The Friend appears in full colour, printed by Warners Midland plc.

The Friend appears every Friday. It has ISSN 0016-1268.

In its entire history, The Friend has failed to appear twice, due to paper rationing during the Second World War.

Between 1892 and some time after 1931, the magazine was printed by The Orphans Press, Leominster.

== List of Editors ==
The main source for this list is an annotated typescript held at The Library of the Society of Friends, London.

- 1843-1849 Charles Tylor
- 1849-1852 Joseph Barrett
- 1852-1857 Edward Newman, "under the guidance of Charles Gilpin, the proprietor".
- 1858-1859 Alfred William Bennett
- 1859-1871 John Frank
- 1872-1875 Joshua Rowntree
- 1875-1878 John Stephenson Rowntree
- 1878-1891 Joseph Stickney Sewell
- 1892-1912 Henry Stanley Newman, assisted by E. B. Reynolds
- 1912-1931 Edward Bassett Reynolds.
- 1932-1949 Hubert William Peet
- 1950-1965 Bernard Hall Canter
- 1966-1973 Clifford Haig
- 1974-1990 David Firth
- 1990-1993 Sally Juniper
- 1993-1997 Deborah Padfield
- 1997-2004 Harry Albright
- September 2004 - April 2010 Judy Kirby
- April 2010 - November 2018 Ian Kirk-Smith
- January 2019 onward - Joseph Jones

== See also ==
- The Family Friend (magazine), published in London from 1849 to 1921
