= Grove House School =

Quaker establishment

Coordinates: 51.58620°N 0.07233°W

Information
- Religious affiliation: Quakers
- Established: 1828
- Founder: Josiah Forster
- Closed: 1877
- Gender: Boys
- Capacity: 75

Grove House School was a Quaker school in Tottenham, United Kingdom.

== School ==
The school was established in 1828 as a boarding school for 75 boys of the Quaker community, initially under Thomas Binns. One of its founders was Josiah Forster, who had attended the Quaker school his grandfather had founded in 1752, Forster's School, also in Tottenham. Its curriculum was advanced for its time, and it did not use corporal punishment. After languishing around 1850, it was enlarged by Arthur Robert Abbott, who admitted non-Quaker boys but after buying the school in 1877, closed it, and took Anglican orders. It was located on the south side of Tottenham Green next to the building of a former Quaker school which had closed some two years before its opening.

In 1890, the Quakers were to found another school, Leighton Park School, Reading as a direct descendant of Grove House. Following on from Grove House and in recognition of the earlier foundation of the school, the first senior Boarding House at Leighton Park was named Grove House. Grove House is a work by architect Alfred Waterhouse, who had attended the original Grove House School. Many families from Grove House continued the connection and sent their boys to Leighton Park, such as the Cadburys, Foxes, Frys, Backhouses and Hodgkins.

The original Grove House in Tottenham Green was acquired by Middlesex County Council for Tottenham Polytechnic in 1897 (then demolished in 1936 to make way for a new building), which later (after a few further intermediary name changes and transferrals between various local government bodies) became the College of North East London in 1990, which in turn is now The College of Haringey, Enfield and North East London following a merger with Enfield College August 2009.

== Alumni ==
- Josiah Forster (1782-1870), Headmaster of Grove House School, anti-slavery campaigner
- Joseph Pease (railway pioneer) (1799-1872), first Quaker MP permitted to take his seat in parliament
- William Henry Leatham (1815-1889), banker and MP
- William Edward Forster (1818-1886), Liberal statesman and businessman whose 1870 Act introduced compulsory primary education
- John Henry Gurney Sr. (1819-1890), banker, MP and ornithologist
- Edmund Backhouse (MP) (1824-1906), MP
- Joseph Lister (1827-1912), surgeon
- Sir Robert Fowler, 1st Baronet (1828-1891), MP
- Alexander Peckover, 1st Baron Peckover (1830-1919), banker
- Alfred Waterhouse (1830-1905), architect
- Thomas Hodgkin (1831-1913), physician
- Edward Burnett Tylor (1832-1917), anthropologist
- Joseph Henry Shorthouse (1834-1903), author
- Arthur Pease (1837-1898), MP
- Rickman Godlee (1849-1925), surgeon
- William Leatham Bright (1851-1910), MP
- George Stacey Albright (1855-1945), a director of Albright and Wilson
- Sir Alfred Pease, 2nd Baronet (1857-1939), MP and sportsman
- Alfred Emmott, 1st Baron Emmott (1858-1926), MP
- John William Wilson (1858-1932), MP
- Jack Pease, 1st Baron Gainford (1860-1943), MP and Chairman of the BBC
- William Somervell (1860-1934), MP and Chairman of K Shoes
- Allan Fea (1860-1956), author
- Henry Head (1861-1940), neurosurgeon
- William Satchell (1861 –1942), author
