= Samuel Jackman Prescod =

Barbadian politician (c.1806–1871)

The Right Excellent Samuel Jackman Prescod
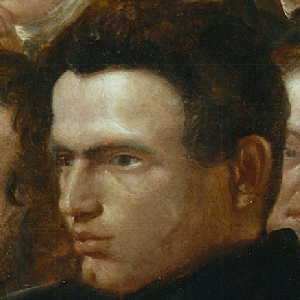
- Portrait at the 1840 anti-slavery convention
- Born: c. 1806; Barbados
- Died: 26 September 1871 (aged 65)
- Education: St Mary's
- Occupations: Journalist, Politician, Judge
- Known for: National Hero of Barbados
- Title: The Right Excellent
- Parent(s): William Prescod and Lidia Smith

Samuel Jackman Prescod NH (c. 1806 – 26 September 1871) became the first person of African descent to be elected to the Parliament of Barbados, in 1843. He also helped found the Liberal Party, whose following included small landowners, businessmen, and coloured clerks. The Parliament of Barbados has enacted that he should be styled as "The Right Excellent" and that his life be celebrated on National Heroes Day (28 April) in Barbados.

== Biography ==
Prescod was born as the son of a free woman of colour, Lidia Smith, and a wealthy white father, William Prescod. He was given his forenames for Samuel Jackman, a local white planter.

Prescod was excluded from politics in Barbados. A law of 1697 required that all voters should be white, own 10 acres (40,000 m^{2}) of land and be of the Christian religion. In fact it was not until 1721 that non-whites testimony was accepted in a court in Barbados.

Prescod began his political work in 1829 and it was on 9 June 1831 a major change took place that allowed people of colour the same rights to vote as white people. The new act passed by Sir James Lyon, the Governor, removed "certain restraints and disabilities imposed by law on His Majesty's Free Coloured and Free Black Subjects in this Island." Postage stamps of both Lyon and Prescod were issued in 2006 to commemorate this event.

Although it was said that Prescod bore "no distinguishing marks of negro complexion" he was still subject to the racial discrimination endemic at that time. Even though he was well educated, a journalist and an acknowledged leader of the coloured community, he was thrown out of the Barbados House of Representatives for observing the political process like any other citizen was entitled to.

It was not until 1836 that non-whites were given their first newspaper, which was called the New Times. Prescod served for eight months without being paid, before the job was taken away from him as it was felt that his ideas were too radical. Prescod moved on to another paper, The Liberal, which was where he found his voice. This paper was targeted at working- and middle-class people irrespective of colour. The paper got into financial difficulties and Prescod was able to buy it in partnership with a man called Thomas Harris. Harris allowed him editorial freedom and this led to problems with the establishment, who saw him as challenging the plantocracy.

In 1838, the concept of slavery was finally outlawed and about 80,000 slaves in Barbados lost their former status. Prescod, however, wrote:

Fellow Men and Friends I have lived to see you declared free men and I hope ... to live and see you made free...

Prescod was aware that the laws preventing all from voting would prevent all the Barbadians from being truly free.

== 1840 ==
Prescod is to the right of this painting of the 1840 Anti-Slavery Convention. Move your cursor to identify him or click the icon to enlarge

In 1840, Prescod journeyed to London to attend the World Anti-Slavery Convention on 12 June 1840. The picture above shows him in a painting made to commemorate the event which attracted delegates from America, France, Haiti, Australia, Ireland, Jamaica and Barbados.

In July 1840, Prescod wrote to the Colonial Office in Barbados as a leader of the coloured community. He was protesting at the high prices that landowners were putting on small plots of land. This was important, since the white owners were using this as a device to prevent other races from entering the land-owning middle class. Moreover, the ability to vote was linked to land ownership. Investigations by the Colonial Office confirmed Prescod's suspicions and the landowners were indeed buying up any small plots of land that did become available, even if this meant some small hardship for themselves. He was successful in getting a change in the law but the effect was minimal. In 1840 there were 1,153 voters; historian Hilary Beckles calculates there was still less than five per cent of the population voting after the bill was passed on 6 June 1840, with the number of eligible voters in 1849 showing only a moderate increase to 1,322.

1840 must have been a very busy year for Prescod, as not only was he writing letters of protest and travelling to Europe and back but he also served eight days in gaol for criminal libel arising out of his editorial freedom with The Liberal newspaper. However, importantly the change in the emancipation had created a new constituency of "Bridgetown".

== Parliament ==
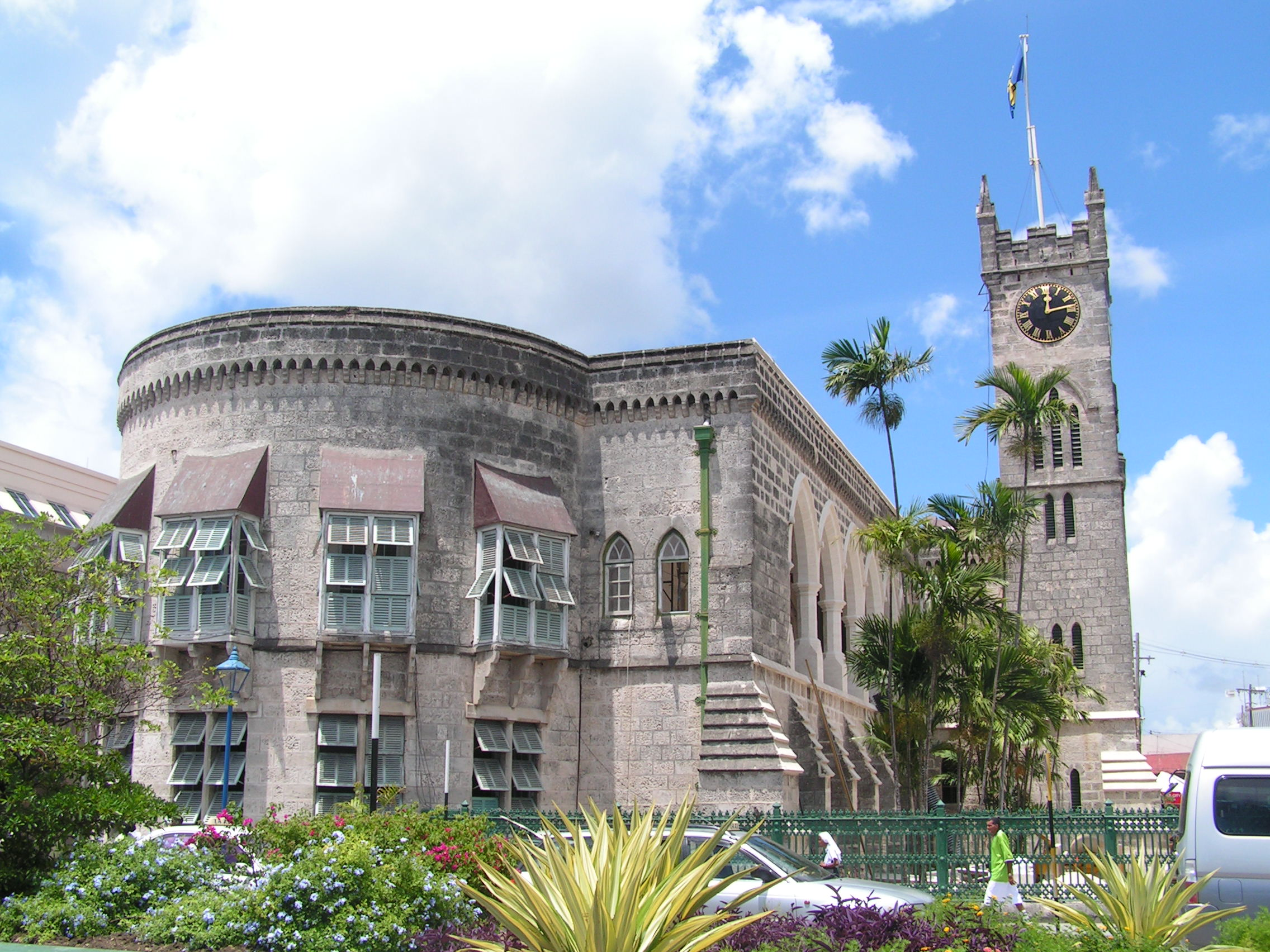
The Parliament building stands to the north of what is now called National Heroes Square

On 6 June 1843, Prescod was one of two people elected from the new constituency of Bridgetown. This was particularly difficult, as not only had he to overcome the prejudices, he had to work especially hard since it was only people who owned land who could vote. Moreover, this was not a secret ballot. At that time the polling booth was a piece of paper with the names of the candidates shown. Beneath the name of your choice you had to sign your name for all to see.

Prescod was always in opposition to the government, but he worked with others to create the Liberal Party. He was particularly noted for his work in creating educational facilities for the children of ex-slaves. This was not just primary and secondary education, but tertiary too, so it is appropriate that an institute of technology was named after him.

== Retirement and death ==
Prescod retired in 1860 and accepted a position as Judge of the Assistant Court of Appeal.

Prescod died in 1871 at the age of 65 on 26 September and he was interred at St. Mary's Church in Bridgetown. The local Barbados Times described him as "the great tribune of the people".

== Legacy ==
Prescod has featured as a face on the 1973 Barbadian one dollar note and on the twenty-dollar note. The twenty-dollar note was redesigned in 1985 and 2000 but still retained Prescod's portrait. He has also appeared on stamps.

The portrait of Samuel Prescod at the 1840 Anti-Slavery Convention still hangs in the National Portrait Gallery in London. His portrait in particular was described by the artist, Benjamin Robert Haydon, as his best so far. Prescod's picture is suggested as an example for visiting schoolchildren of a person they could research further.

In April 1998, the Order of National Heroes Act was passed by the Parliament of Barbados. According to the government, the act established that 28 April (the centenary of the birth of Sir Grantley Adams) would be celebrated as National Heroes' Day. The act also declared that there are ten national heroes of Barbados, all of whom would be elevated to the title of "The Right Excellent".

The Samuel Jackman Prescod Institute of Technology and Jackmans, a town in the Saint Michael parish, are named in his honour.
