= Josiah Forster =

English teacher and philanthropist

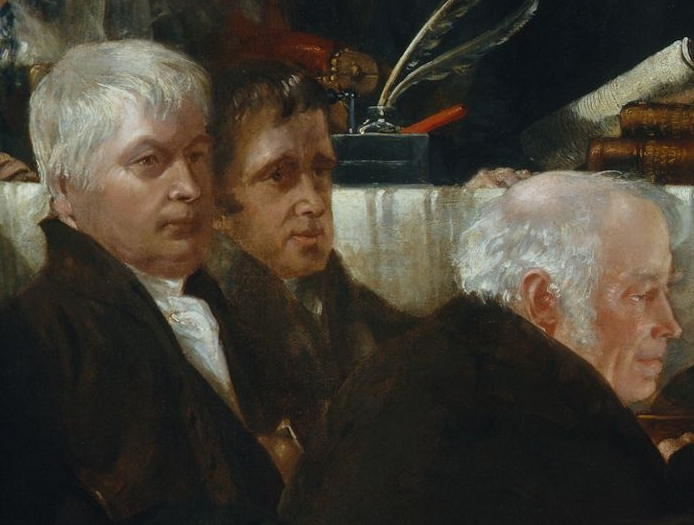
- Josiah in the centre
- Born: 1782; Tottenham
- Died: 27 June 1870
- Resting place: Tottenham Friends' burial ground
- Education: Forster's school (founded by his grandfather)
- Occupations: Teacher and writer
- Known for: Slavery abolitionist, Bible society
- Spouse(s): 1.Rachel Wilson; 2.Sarah Dillworth
- Children: one (died a baby)
- Parent: William Forster (1747–1824)and Elizabeth Hayward (1759–1837)
- Relatives: William (brother), William Edward (nephew)

Josiah Forster (1782 – 27 June 1870) was an English teacher and philanthropist. He was an early member of the British and Foreign Anti-Slavery Society in 1839 and a supporter of the British and Foreign Bible Society. Both he and his wife were senior figures in the British Quakers.

== Biography ==
Forster was born in 1782. He became a teacher at the school his grandfather, also Josiah Forster (1693–1763), had founded in Tottenham. The school started in 1752 in the ballroom of their grandfather's house and was called Forster's School. His first wife, Rachel (née Wilson) was over thirty years older than he was, and died in 1801.

Forster started another school in 1805 in Southgate that eventually moved to Tottenham in 1820. He ran this school until 1826 when he decided to devote more time to his Quaker interests. His wife had already been made a minister in 1810, and shortly afterward he began sitting on Quaker committees; in 1817 he became an elder of the church. He campaigned for anti-slavery and worked for the British and Foreign Bible Society. He held the senior position of clerk to the Annual meeting of British Quakers from 1820 to 1831.

In 1838, Forster accompanied Elizabeth Fry, her husband, Lydia Irving and William Allen on Friend's business and a tour and inspection of prisons in France. They were there on other business but despite the language barrier Fry and Lydia Irving visited French prisons.

Forster sat on a committee of Quaker elders in 1836-7 who unsuccessfully tried to heal a schism in the Quaker church caused by the Beaconite Controversy. The controversy was named after a book published in January 1835 called A Beacon to the Society of Friends which was written by Isaac Crewdson, a leader to the Manchester Quaker meeting. The controversy, which related to evangelism in the society, eventually led to the resignation of Crewdson and about 300 similarly minded people across the country.

The Society for the Abolition of the Slave Trade was mainly a Quaker society founded in the eighteenth century by Thomas Clarkson. Slavery had in theory been made illegal in 1807 in the British Empire. Following the Reform Act, William Wilberforce was able to get legislation through parliament. In 1838 legislation freed the slaves who had been relabelled apprentices. As a result, in August 1838 800,000 people in the British empire became free.

Forster is on the left of centre near the front in this painting which is of the 1840 Anti-Slavery Convention. Move your cursor to identify him or click icon to enlarge

A picture was commissioned that showed the delegates, including Josiah Forster, of the new British and Foreign Anti-Slavery Society which was formed in 1839. The painting captured this important international convention in June, 1840. Also in this painting are Josiah's brothers, Robert and William Forster, many significant figures including Isaac Crewdson. This new society's aim was "The universal extinction of slavery and the slave trade and the protection of the rights and interests of the enfranchised population in the British possessions and of all persons captured as slaves."

In 1842-3 a schism developed in the Society of Friends in Salem in Iowa. The difference developed over the ways that the society should support slavery, which was still an important part of the American economy. A rival meeting house had been created, and a separate burial ground which was separated from the older Quaker burial ground by a mere two feet of space. Four delegates were sent from Britain: Forster, his brother William, George Stacey and John Allen. The group did not manage to heal the divide immediately but it was resolved by 1848.

In 1849 the yearly meeting of the Quakers requested that representatives be sent to the rulers of the Christian nations. Forster accompanied his brother, William, in 1853 when they and two others visited the American president, Franklin Pierce, and journeyed to spread the news around the governors of the southern American states. It was during this journey that William died and was buried in the Quaker town of Friendsville in Tennessee which was on the Underground Railroad.

Josiah Forster and his wife, Sarah, established a trust in 1862, where four new cottages were to be given to poor widows aged 55 or over. The managing committee was to be four Quakers including his nephew, W.E. Forster M.P.

He attended the annual meeting of the British Quakers until his death in 1870.

== Bible societies ==
Forster was a long and valued supporter of the evangelical work of publishing and distributing Bibles. In 1862 he chaired a meeting at Bible House, Blackfriars, where it was agreed that £2000 be sent to the American Bible Society, the US sister society of the British and Foreign Bible Society.

== Education ==
Besides working at his grandfather's school, Forster helped to found the Grove House School in 1828 and he served on the management committee of the Lancasterian Boys' School in Tottenham. Forster and his brother Robert were lifelong members of the London committee for Ackworth School.

== Memorials ==
Two almshouses in Tottenham are named after him. They provide four one-bedroomed sheltered homes for the elderly.

== Works ==
- Some Reflections on the Importance of a Religious Life: offered to younger members of the Society of Friends, 1834, 37pp, Society of Friends, accessed 14 July 2008
- Piety Promoted in Brief Biographical Memorials of Some of the Religious Society of Friends, Commonly Called Quakers

== Sources ==
- William Forster, Benjamin Seebohn (1865). Memoirs of William Forster: In Two Volumes. A. W. Bennett.
