= William Morgan (abolitionist) =

British abolitionist (1815–1890)

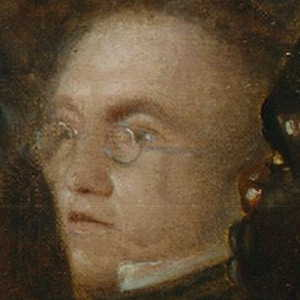
- Morgan in a detail from a painting at the National Portrait Gallery
- Born: 1815; England
- Died: c. 1890 (aged 74–75)

William Morgan (1815 – c. 1890) was a leading member of the Birmingham Anti-Slavery Society, whose members were very influential in abolitionist movements in Britain.

== Career ==
Morgan was trained as a solicitor and worked in Birmingham.

He was an active member of the Birmingham Anti-Slavery Society, which campaigned for abolition of slavery in the British Empire in 1838. On the anniversary of the abolition a celebration was again held in Birmingham and it was Morgan who distributed information and invitations to the local Sunday Schools.

Morgan was a founder of the local Baptist Union and served as secretary to the Birmingham Anti-Slavery Society revived around 1835, when British slavery was made illegal (in 1838). The picture shows him at the 1840 Anti-Slavery Convention which was organised by Morgan's colleague Joseph Sturge. Morgan served as a secretary at the 1840 convention. He continued to work with Sturge during the 1850s.

He became the Town clerk in Birmingham and gave a collection of books to Birmingham Library. In 1866, the British and Foreign Anti-Slavery Society sent Morgan to Jamaica.

== Family ==
Morgan was the third son of the Reverend Thomas Morgan. He married Henrietta Barnard, from Nailsworth in Gloucestershire, on 6 March 1841.

== Works ==
- The Arabs of tía City or a Plea for Brotherhood with the Outcast - Address to the YMCA, Birmingham, 1853 (when he was Town Clerk of Birmingham), Hudson and Son, London
