= Stephen Grellet =

French-American Quaker missionary

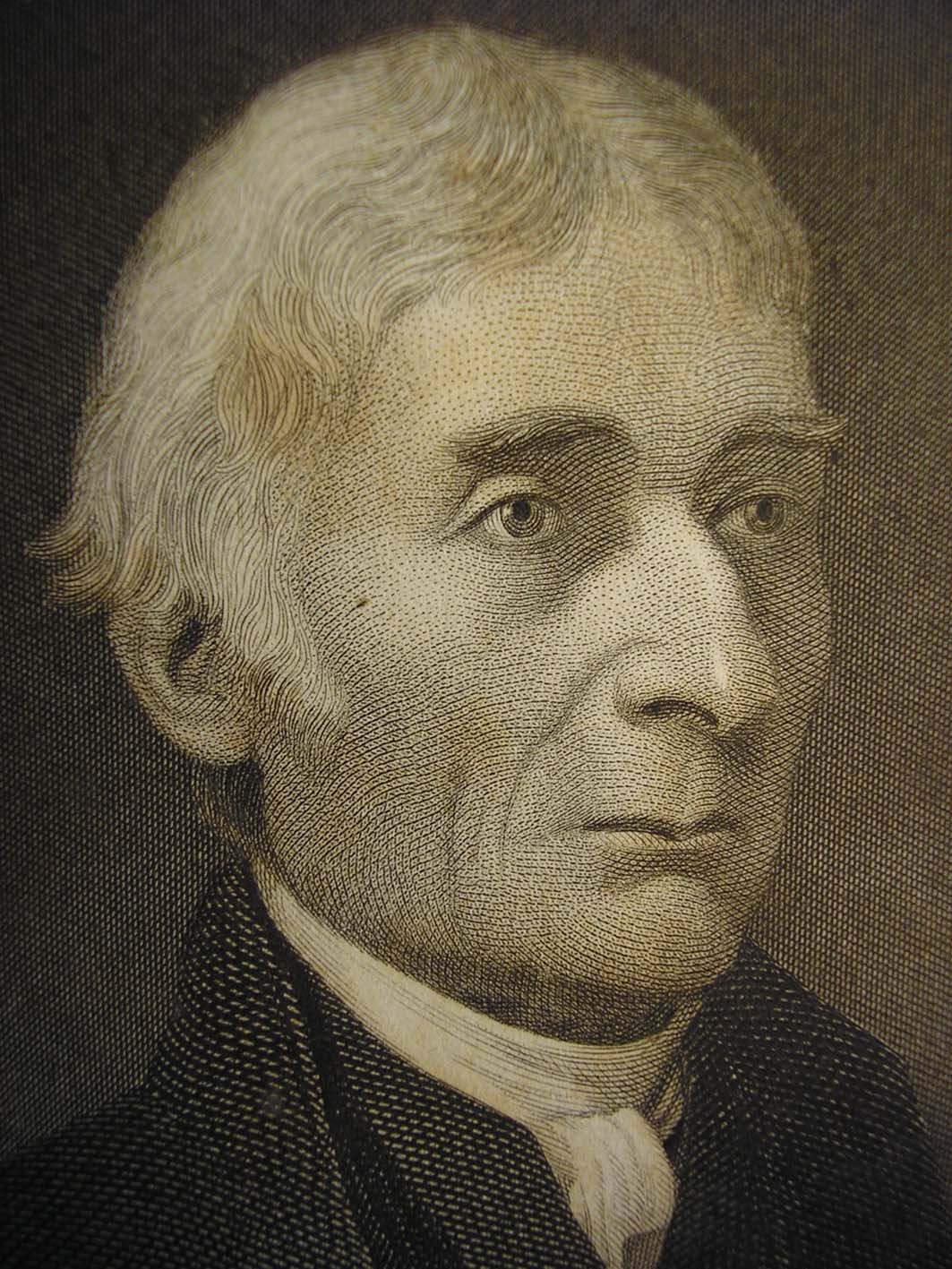
Stephen Grellet

Stephen Grellet (28 October 1772 – 16 November 1855) was a prominent French-American Quaker missionary.

== Life ==
Grellet was born Étienne de Grellet du Mabillier in Limoges, France, the son of Antoine Gabriel Grellet, a counsellor of King Louis XVI who was also director of the first chinaware factory in Limoges. His family had some interest in iron making. Raised as a Roman Catholic, he was educated at the Military College of Lyons, now the Institut d'études politiques de Lyon, and at the age of 17 he entered the personal guard of the king. During the French Revolution he was sentenced to be executed, but escaped and eventually fled Europe to Demerara in South America with his brother Joseph in 1793, then to New York in 1795.

While in New York he met Deborah Darby, an English Quaker minister who had been in the U.S. since August 1793. Darby made an impression on Grellet and under her and William Savery's influence he decided to join the Quakers (Society of Friends). Darby and Grellet became friends; when Darby returned to Britain with her colleague Rebecca Young, she was accompanied by four American Quakers (including William Savery), and Grellet was there to wave them off.

Grellet became involved in extensive missionary work in prisons and hospitals across North America and most of the countries of Europe, and was granted meetings with many rulers and dignitaries, including Pope Pius VII, Tsar Alexander I, and the Kings of Spain and Prussia. He often travelled with William Allen, and visited many schools, hospitals and prisons as well as speaking out against slavery. He also visited Haiti in 1816 and Russia in 1819.

In 1804 Grellet married Rebecca Collins, the daughter of the publisher Isaac Collins. The family home, the Isaac Collins House, in Burlington, New Jersey, is now listed on the National Register of Historic Places.

Grellet died in Burlington on 16 November 1855 and his body was buried there, behind the Quaker Meeting House at 340 High Street.

== Family ==
Grellet was married to Rebecca and they had one daughter, Rachel.

== Bibliography ==
- Benjamin Seebohm: Memoirs of the life and gospel labours of Stephen Grellet, Longstreth, Philadelphia, 1862 (3rd ed.), 426+438 p.
- Frances Anne Budge : A missionary life : Stephen Grellet, Nisbet, London, 1888, 127 p.
- William Guest : Stephen Grellet, Headley, London, 1903, 226 p.
- William Wistar Comfort, 'Stephen Grellet, 1773-1855', MacMillan, New York, 1942, 202p.
- Claus Bernet (2007). "Grellet, Stephen". In Bautz, Traugott (ed.). Biographisch-Bibliographisches Kirchenlexikon (BBKL) (in German). Vol. 28. Nordhausen: Bautz. cols. 687–690. ISBN 978-3-88309-413-7.
